= T. leonina =

T. leonina may refer to:

- Thyrocopa leonina, a moth species in the genus Thyrocopa endemic to Hawaii
- Toxascaris leonina, a common parasitic roundworm species found in dogs, cats, foxes and related host species

== See also ==
- Leonina (disambiguation)
