= Thyrocopa peleana =

Scientific classification
- Domain: Eukaryota
- Kingdom: Animalia
- Phylum: Arthropoda
- Class: Insecta
- Order: Lepidoptera
- Family: Xyloryctidae
- Genus: Thyrocopa
- Species: T. peleana

Binomial name
- Thyrocopa peleana Swezey, 1932

Species of moth

Thyrocopa peleana is a moth of the family Xyloryctidae. It is endemic to the Hawaiian island of Oahu. It may be extinct.

The length of the forewings is 11–19 mm (0.43–0.75 in). Adults are on wing at least in September.
