= Thyrocopa elikapekae =

Scientific classification
- Domain: Eukaryota
- Kingdom: Animalia
- Phylum: Arthropoda
- Class: Insecta
- Order: Lepidoptera
- Family: Xyloryctidae
- Genus: Thyrocopa
- Species: T. elikapekae

Binomial name
- Thyrocopa elikapekae Medeiros, 2009

Species of moth

Thyrocopa elikapekae is a moth of the family Xyloryctidae. It was first described by Matthew J. Medeiros in 2009. It is endemic to the Hawaiian island of Kauai.

The length of the forewings is 9–12 mm. Adults are on wing from at least April to October.
