= Thyrocopa albonubila =

Scientific classification
- Domain: Eukaryota
- Kingdom: Animalia
- Phylum: Arthropoda
- Class: Insecta
- Order: Lepidoptera
- Family: Xyloryctidae
- Genus: Thyrocopa
- Species: T. albonubila

Binomial name
- Thyrocopa albonubila Walsingham, 1907

Species of moth

Thyrocopa albonubila is a moth of the family Xyloryctidae. It was first described by Lord Walsingham in 1907. It is endemic to the Hawaiian island of Kauai.

The length of the forewings is 10–13 mm. It is the only Kauai Thyrocopa that has a white forewing with conspicuous black spots. Adults are on wing year round.
