= Thyrocopa kokeensis =

Scientific classification
- Domain: Eukaryota
- Kingdom: Animalia
- Phylum: Arthropoda
- Class: Insecta
- Order: Lepidoptera
- Family: Xyloryctidae
- Genus: Thyrocopa
- Species: T. kokeensis

Binomial name
- Thyrocopa kokeensis Medeiros, 2009

Species of moth

Thyrocopa kokeensis is a moth of the family Xyloryctidae. It was first described by Matthew J. Medeiros in 2009. The species is endemic to the Hawaiian island of Kauai.

The length of the forewings is 8–9 mm. Adults are on wing at least from July to October.
