= Thyrocopa sapindiella =

Scientific classification
- Domain: Eukaryota
- Kingdom: Animalia
- Phylum: Arthropoda
- Class: Insecta
- Order: Lepidoptera
- Family: Xyloryctidae
- Genus: Thyrocopa
- Species: T. sapindiella

Binomial name
- Thyrocopa sapindiella Swezey, 1913

Species of moth

Thyrocopa sapindiella, the Oahu aulu thyrocopa moth, is a moth of the family Xyloryctidae. It was first described by Otto Swezey in 1913. It is endemic to the Hawaiian island of Oahu. It may be extinct.

The length of the forewings is about 9 mm. Adults are on wing at least in November.
