= KaiserAir =

American aviation services company

IATA	ICAO	Call sign
KI	KAI	KAISER
- Founded: 1946
- Hubs: Oakland; Sonoma
- Fleet size: 4
- Headquarters: Oakland, California, United States
- Key people: Ronald J. Guerra (CEO and President)
- Website: www.kaiserair.com

KaiserAir is an aircraft management and charter company. It operates two FBOs in the San Francisco Bay Area, at Oakland San Francisco Bay Airport and Sonoma County Airport. In addition to charter flights for VIP passengers, corporations, and sports teams, KaiserAir operates weekly flights to Hawaii, the Kona Shuttle and Hawaii Shuttle.

The company was originally part of the in-house flight department of industrialist Henry J. Kaiser. The flight department was sold off to its chief pilot, Ronald J. Guerra, in 1980.

== History ==
KaiserAir grew out of the flight department of industrialist Henry J. Kaiser. The flight department was formed in 1946 to organize the transport requirements of the Kaiser group of companies. The department flew Gulfstreams, Hawkers, Falcons and JetStars. The company began providing transport, maintenance and aircraft management services to third parties in 1967. In 1980 Kaiser Steel sold the company to Ronald Guerra, KaiserAir's chief pilot, for $150,000. The Kona Shuttle, an exclusive air service to Hawaii for VIPs, used the KaiserAir terminal at Oakland International Airport. When the companies providing these flights (Primaris Airlines and Ryan International Airlines) failed, KaiserAir acquired its first large passenger jet, a Boeing 737-700 and took on the service itself. It initially flew under the certificate of Miami Air International, but in 2011 the company obtained a certificate of their own becoming the first new airline on the Oakland Airport in over 50 years. KaiserAir has since acquired four Boeing 737s.

KaiserAir's past clients have included former U.S. Presidents, royalty, celebrities, and Fortune 500 executives. KaiserAir's Boeing 737-500 was chartered for the Joe Biden 2020 Presidential Campaign.

== Operations ==
KaiserAir's main operation is from Oakland San Francisco Bay Airport where it runs its charter airline, managed aircraft for private clients, and fixed-base operator (FBO) services. It has been operating from this site since 1946. It has a second FBO at Santa Rosa Airport. In 2011, KaiserAir had 150 employees across both sites. KaiserAir has a large VIP lounge and other passenger facilities.

KaiserAir has provided team transport to the San Jose Sharks of the National Hockey League since 2015.

Beginning in the 2025-26 season, KaiserAir has been providing team transport for the Vegas Golden Knights, using a team dedicated 737-700.

== Fleet ==
As of November 2025, KaiserAir operates a fleet of four Boeing 737 Next Generation jets. It previously operated a Boeing 737-500 as well as Gulfstream and Cessna Citation family jets.

KaiserAir
Aircraft	In service	Orders	Passengers							Notes
Aircraft	In service	Orders	J	F	W	Y+	Y	Total	Refs	Notes
Boeing 737-700	2	—	—	60	—	—	—	60		Used for Kona Shuttle
Boeing 737-700	2	—	—	—	—	—	120	120		Used for Kona Shuttle
Boeing 737-800	2	—	—	60	—	—	—	60		1 leased by the Harris-Walz campaign and used for Tim Walz’s campaigning.
Boeing 737-800	2	—	—	—	—	—	120	120		1 leased by the Harris-Walz campaign and used for Tim Walz’s campaigning.

As of 2011 (when KaiserAir had only one Boeing 737) they had a total of approximately twenty jets and ten turboprops based at Oakland.
