= Thyrocopa brevipalpis =

Scientific classification
- Kingdom: Animalia
- Phylum: Arthropoda
- Clade: Pancrustacea
- Class: Insecta
- Order: Lepidoptera
- Family: Xyloryctidae
- Genus: Thyrocopa
- Species: T. brevipalpis

Binomial name
- Thyrocopa brevipalpis (Walsingham, 1907)

Synonyms
- Psychra brevipalpis Walsingham, 1907; Psychra phycidiformis Walsingham, 1907; Thyrocopa phycidiformis (Walsingham, 1907)

Species of moth

Thyrocopa brevipalpis is a moth of the family Xyloryctidae. It is endemic to the Hawaiian island of Kauai.

The length of the forewings is 9–16 mm. Adults are on wing year round. It has a remarkably variable wing pattern.

Larvae have been reared on Hedyotis terminalis.
