= Thyrocopa decipiens =

Scientific classification
- Domain: Eukaryota
- Kingdom: Animalia
- Phylum: Arthropoda
- Class: Insecta
- Order: Lepidoptera
- Family: Xyloryctidae
- Genus: Thyrocopa
- Species: T. decipiens

Binomial name
- Thyrocopa decipiens (Walsingham, 1907)

Synonyms
- Catamempsis decipiens Walsingham, 1907

Species of moth

Thyrocopa decipiens is a moth of the family Xyloryctidae. It was first described by Lord Walsingham in 1907. It is endemic to the Hawaiian islands of Oahu, Molokai, Maui and Hawaii.
