= Thyrocopa megas =

Scientific classification
- Domain: Eukaryota
- Kingdom: Animalia
- Phylum: Arthropoda
- Class: Insecta
- Order: Lepidoptera
- Family: Xyloryctidae
- Genus: Thyrocopa
- Species: T. megas

Binomial name
- Thyrocopa megas Walsingham, 1907

Species of moth

Thyrocopa megas is a moth of the family Xyloryctidae. It was first described by Lord Walsingham in 1907. It is endemic to the Hawaiian islands of Oahu and Maui.

The length of the forewings is about 13–18 mm. Adults are on wing at least from March to October.
