= Thyrocopa acetosa =

Scientific classification
- Kingdom: Animalia
- Phylum: Arthropoda
- Clade: Pancrustacea
- Class: Insecta
- Order: Lepidoptera
- Family: Xyloryctidae
- Genus: Thyrocopa
- Species: T. acetosa

Binomial name
- Thyrocopa acetosa Meyrick, 1915

Species of moth

Thyrocopa abusa is a moth of the family Xyloryctidae. It was first described by Edward Meyrick in 1915. It is endemic to the Hawaiian island of Kauai.

The length of the forewings is about 10 mm.
