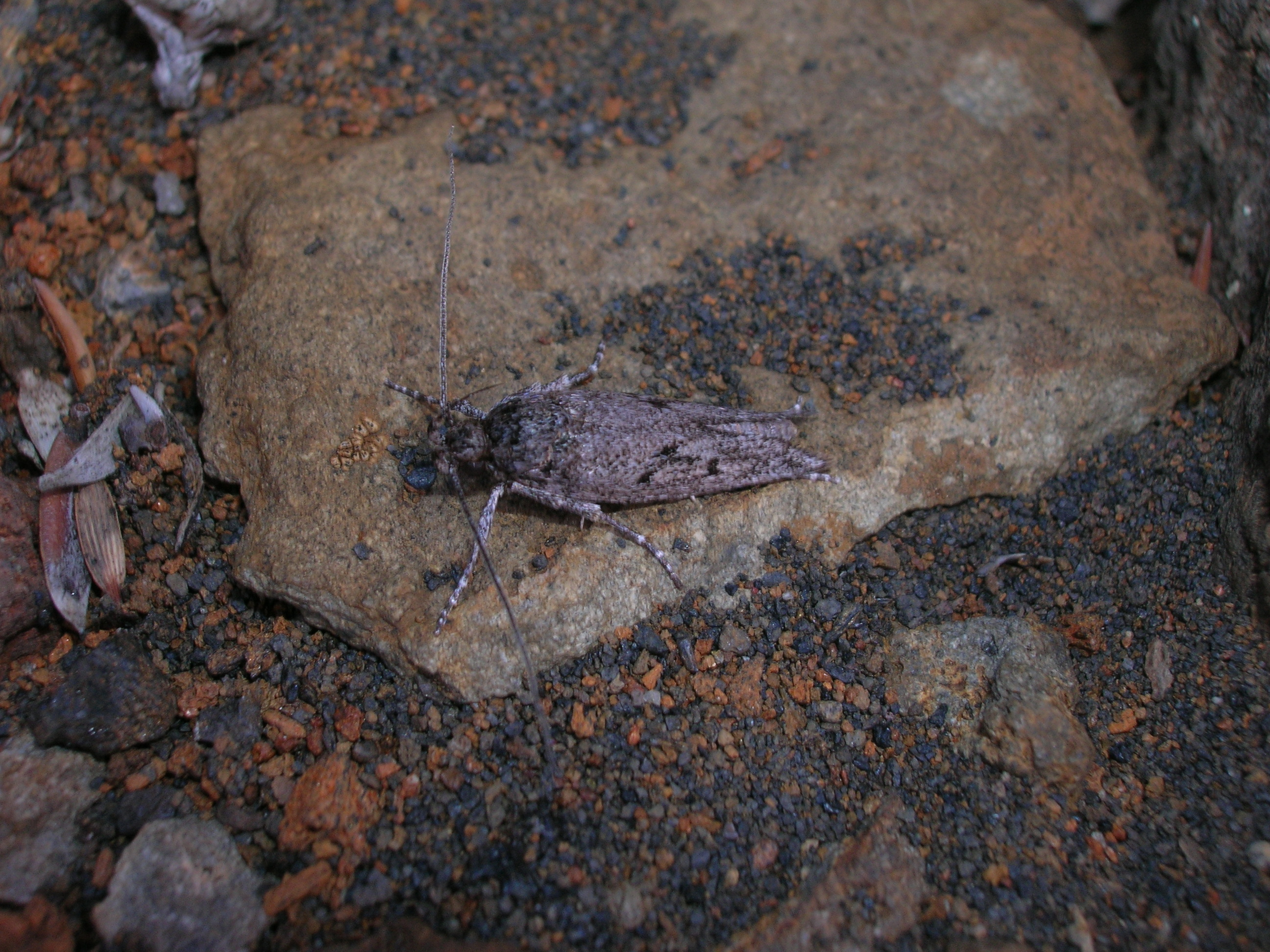
- Grasshopper moth (Thyrocopa apatela); Haleakala National Park, Maui, Hawaii

Scientific classification
- Kingdom: Animalia
- Phylum: Arthropoda
- Clade: Pancrustacea
- Class: Insecta
- Order: Lepidoptera
- Family: Xyloryctidae
- Genus: Thyrocopa; Meyrick 1883

Species
- see text

Synonyms
- Synomotis Meyrick, 1883; Hodegia Walsingham, 1907; Ptychothrix Walsingham, 1907; Psychra Walsingham, 1907; Catamempsis Walsingham, 1907

= Thyrocopa =

Moth genus in family Xyloryctidae

Thyrocopa is a genus of moths in the family Xyloryctidae endemic to Hawaii. The taxon has approximately forty species, including some flightless species.

== Adults ==
Although some Agrotis species occur at very high altitudes in Hawaii and female Agrotis from New Zealand are sometimes brachypterous, brachyptery in both sexes of Lepidoptera species is rare and is usually limited to wind-battered habitats, often southern oceanic islands and sparsely vegetated areas where the moths locomote by jumping. Thyrocopa includes the only species of flightless alpine moth in the Hawaiian Islands.

Having studied males and females of two different species (Thyrocopa apatela and Thyrocopa kikaelekea), researchers at University of California, Berkeley concluded that they had not evolved from a flightless common ancestor nor had they dispersed to new habitats after becoming flightless. Rather, each was descended from a flying ancestor but had separately undergone wing reduction and evolved flightlessness in a case of parallel evolution occurring in less than 1 million years. The adaptation is thought to be a response to specific environmental pressures such as scattered food resources, lack of predation, high winds, and low temperatures that elicit loss of flight. Their hypothesis is supported by both molecular and morphological evidence.

== Larvae ==
An entomologist at the University of Bristol described most larvae of this genus as generalist feeders that eat decaying leaf tissue and generally hide in webby frass structures they make themselves. The larva of an undescribed species has a slightly different appearance from the generalist species and seems to be a specialist borer in Broussaisia arguta, a perennial native-Hawaiian relative of the hydrangea. At 20 °C in the laboratory, specimens stayed larvae for 2–20 weeks and remained in pupa form for 2–8, a range in development time indicative of a number of species being kept together in the study.

The larvae have been collected on a wide variety of host plants (most of them endemic to Hawaiʻi) including maile (Alyxia oliviformis), paʻiniu (Astelia argyrocoma), ʻākōlea (Athyrium microphyllum), Carex spp., lapalapa (Cheirodendron platyphyllum), pilo (Coprosma elliptica), koi (Coprosma kauensis), ʻukiʻuki (Dianella sandwicensis), uluhe (Dicranopteris linearis), Dryopteris spp., naʻenaʻe ʻula (Dubautia raillardioides), Elaphoglossum spp., manono (Hedyotis terminalis), kakaemoa (Melicope clusiifolia), ʻōhiʻa lehua (Metrosideros polymorpha), kōlea (Myrsine punctata), kōpiko (Psychotria spp.), sawtooth blackberry (Rubus argutus), hoi kuahiwi (Smilax melastomifolia), pūkiawe (Styphelia tameiameiae), and ʻohelo kau laʻau (Vaccinium calycinum).

== Species ==
The genus contains the following species:

- T. abusa
- T. acetosa
- T. albonubila
- T. alterna
- T. apatela (common names: grasshopper moth, and Haleakala flightless moth)
- T. apikia
- T. brevipalpis
- T. cinerella
- T. decipiens
- T. elikapekae
- T. epicapna
- T. geminipuncta
- T. gigas
- T. indecora
- T. kanaloa
- T. kea
- T. keliae
- T. kikaelekea, a recently described species
- T. kokeensis
- T. leonina
- T. megas
- T. minor
- T. neckerensis
- T. nihoa
- T. peleana
- T. sapindiela (common name: Oahu aulu thyrocopa moth)
- T. seminatella
- T. spilobathra
- T. subahenea
- T. usitata
- T. vagans
- T. viduella

== Photo links ==
- University of Bristol
- Hawaiian Ecosystems at Risk: Insects of Hawaii
- Hawaiian Ecosystems at Risk: Insects of Hawaii
- MorphBank Images
