= Thyrocopa keliae =

Scientific classification
- Domain: Eukaryota
- Kingdom: Animalia
- Phylum: Arthropoda
- Class: Insecta
- Order: Lepidoptera
- Family: Xyloryctidae
- Genus: Thyrocopa
- Species: T. keliae

Binomial name
- Thyrocopa keliae Medeiros, 2015

Species of moth

Thyrocopa keliae is a species of moth in the genus Thyrocopa. It is endemic to Molokai in the Hawaiian Islands.
