= Thyrocopa viduella =

Scientific classification
- Domain: Eukaryota
- Kingdom: Animalia
- Phylum: Arthropoda
- Class: Insecta
- Order: Lepidoptera
- Family: Xyloryctidae
- Genus: Thyrocopa
- Species: T. viduella

Binomial name
- Thyrocopa viduella Walsingham, 1907

Species of moth

Thyrocopa viduella is a moth of the family Xyloryctidae. It is endemic to the Hawaiian island of Kauai.

The length of the forewings is 14–17 mm. Adults are on wing at least from June to August.
