= Thyrocopa subahenea =

Scientific classification
- Domain: Eukaryota
- Kingdom: Animalia
- Phylum: Arthropoda
- Class: Insecta
- Order: Lepidoptera
- Family: Xyloryctidae
- Genus: Thyrocopa
- Species: T. subahenea

Binomial name
- Thyrocopa subahenea Walsingham, 1907

Species of moth

Thyrocopa subahenea is a moth of the family Xyloryctidae. It was first described by Lord Walsingham in 1907. It is endemic to the Hawaiian islands of Molokai and Maui.

The length of the forewings is 8–12 mm. Adults are on wing year round. The ground color of the forewings is brown.
