= Thyrocopa nihoa =

Scientific classification
- Domain: Eukaryota
- Kingdom: Animalia
- Phylum: Arthropoda
- Class: Insecta
- Order: Lepidoptera
- Family: Xyloryctidae
- Genus: Thyrocopa
- Species: T. nihoa

Binomial name
- Thyrocopa nihoa Medeiros, 2009

Species of moth

Thyrocopa nihoa is a moth of the family Xyloryctidae. It was first described by Matthew J. Medeiros in 2009. It is endemic to Nīhoa in the Northwestern Hawaiian Islands.

The length of the forewings is about 7 mm. Adults are on wing at least in August and September.

== Etymology ==
The species name nihoa refers to Nīhoa, the only locality where this moth occurs.
