= Thyrocopa apikia =

Scientific classification
- Domain: Eukaryota
- Kingdom: Animalia
- Phylum: Arthropoda
- Class: Insecta
- Order: Lepidoptera
- Family: Xyloryctidae
- Genus: Thyrocopa
- Species: T. apikia

Binomial name
- Thyrocopa apikia Medeiros, 2009

Species of moth

Thyrocopa apikia is a moth of the family Xyloryctidae. It was described by Matthew J. Medeiros in 2009 and is endemic to the Hawaiian island of Molokai.

The length of the forewings is 14–16 mm. Adults are on wing from at least May to September.
