= Thyrocopa geminipuncta =

Scientific classification
- Domain: Eukaryota
- Kingdom: Animalia
- Phylum: Arthropoda
- Class: Insecta
- Order: Lepidoptera
- Family: Xyloryctidae
- Genus: Thyrocopa
- Species: T. geminipuncta

Binomial name
- Thyrocopa geminipuncta Walsingham, 1907

Species of moth

Thyrocopa geminipuncta is a moth of the family Xyloryctidae. It was first described by Lord Walsingham in 1907. It is endemic to the Hawaiian islands of Maui and Molokai.

The length of the forewings is 10–11 mm. Adults have been collected in May and September.
