= Thyrocopa vagans =

Scientific classification
- Domain: Eukaryota
- Kingdom: Animalia
- Phylum: Arthropoda
- Class: Insecta
- Order: Lepidoptera
- Family: Xyloryctidae
- Genus: Thyrocopa
- Species: T. vagans

Binomial name
- Thyrocopa vagans (Walsingham, 1907)

Synonyms
- Ptychothrix vagans Walsingham, 1907

Species of moth

Thyrocopa vagans is a moth of the family Xyloryctidae. It was first described by Lord Walsingham in 1906. It is endemic to the Hawaiian island of Kauai.

The length of the forewings is about 8 mm. Adults are on wing at least in May, August, and September. The ground color of the forewings is mostly very light gray, mottled with a few brown scales, darker near thorax and along the costal margin. The hindwings are light brown. The fringe is very light brown.
