= Thyrocopa cinerella =

Scientific classification
- Domain: Eukaryota
- Kingdom: Animalia
- Phylum: Arthropoda
- Class: Insecta
- Order: Lepidoptera
- Family: Xyloryctidae
- Genus: Thyrocopa
- Species: T. cinerella

Binomial name
- Thyrocopa cinerella Walsingham, 1907

Species of moth

Thyrocopa cinerella is a moth of the family Xyloryctidae. It is endemic to the Hawaiian island of Kauai.

The length of the forewings is 15–19 mm. Adults are on wing from at least April to July.
