= Thyrocopa abusa =

Scientific classification
- Domain: Eukaryota
- Kingdom: Animalia
- Phylum: Arthropoda
- Class: Insecta
- Order: Lepidoptera
- Family: Xyloryctidae
- Genus: Thyrocopa
- Species: T. abusa

Binomial name
- Thyrocopa abusa Walsingham, 1907

Synonyms
- Thyrocopa usitata Butler, sensu Meyrick, 1883; Thyrocopa depressariella Walsingham, 1907; Thyrocopa fraudulentella Walsingham, 1907; Thyrocopa immutata Walsingham, 1907; Thyrocopa ingeminata Meyrick, 1915; Thyrocopa nubifer Walsingham, 1907; Thyrocopa pallida Walsingham 1907

Species of moth

Thyrocopa abusa is a moth of the family Xyloryctidae. It was first described by Lord Walsingham in 1907. It is endemic to the Hawaiian islands of Kauai, Oahu, Molokai, Lanai, Maui and Hawaii. It is the type species of the genus Thyrocopa.

Adults are on wing year round.

The larvae feed on Acacia koa, Cyrtandra, Freycinetia, guava, Ipomoea, Lantana, Pipturus and Ricinus.
