= Lava-flow hazard zones =

Hazardous volcanic areas

The Island of Hawaiʻi was mapped into 9 Zones meant to portray the future long-term hazard due to lava flow activity. (USGS)

Lava Flow Hazard Zones are areas designated by the United States Geological Survey for the Island of Hawaiʻi and Maui in the United States. First prepared in 1974 by Donal Mullineaux and Donald Peterson of the USGS and revised in 1992 for the Island of Hawaiʻi, the maps outline the qualitative hazard posed by lava flows based on the history of lava flow activity on each of the five volcanoes that form the Island of Hawaiʻi and Haleakalā volcano on the island of Maui. Zone 1 represents the areas that are most hazardous and Zone 9 the least hazardous. Elsewhere in the world, areas around the town of Grindavík have been declared lava-flow hazard zones, and partially damaged by lava flows.

== USGS Lava Hazard Zone definitions ==
The lava flow hazard zones are based on location of eruptive vents, past lava coverage, and topography.

- Zone 1 - Includes summits and rift zones of Kilauea and Mauna Loa volcanoes, where vents have been repeatedly active in historical time.
- Zone 2 - Areas adjacent to and downslope of zone 1. 15-25% of zone 2 has been covered by lava since 1800, and 25-75% has been covered within the past 750 years. Relative hazard within zone 2 decreases gradually as one moves away from zone 1.
- Zone 3 - Areas less hazardous than zone 2 because of greater distance from recently active vents and (or) because of topography. 1-5% of zone 3 has been covered since 1800, and 15-75% has been covered within the past 750 years.
- Zone 4 - Includes all of Hualālai, where the frequency of eruptions is lower than that for Kilauea or Mauna Loa. Lava coverage is proportionally smaller, about 5% since 1800, and less than 15% within the past 750 years.
- Zone 5 - Area on Kilauea currently protected by topography
- Zone 6 - Two areas on Mauna Loa, both protected by topography
- Zone 7 - Younger part of Mauna Kea volcano. 20% of this area was covered by lava in the past 10,000 years.
- Zone 8 - Remaining part of Mauna Kea. Only a few percents of this area has been covered by lava in the past 10,000 years.
- Zone 9 - Kohala Volcano, which last erupted over 60,000 years ago.
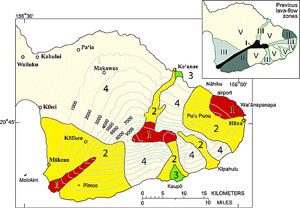
  Lava Flow Hazard map of Haleakala. The Maui Hazard Zone numbers are a different scale from the island of Hawaiʻi's map.

The lava flow hazard zones on Maui use a different scale. They can be compared to Hawai'i Island's lava zones.

- Maui Zone 1 - Includes the crater of Haleakalā and some rift zones, mainly areas that have experienced major eruptions in the last 1500 years. This is similar to Zone 3 on the island of Hawaiʻi.
- Maui Zone 2 - Areas that are mainly downslope of the peak of Haleakalā. These areas have mostly been covered in lava in at least the last 13,000 years or are expected to be near possible rift sites. This zone is similar to Zone 4 on the island of Hawaiʻi.
- Maui Zone 3 - These are areas protected by topology caused by previous lava flows in the last 40,000 years. This makes it most similar to Zone 6 on the island of Hawaiʻi, which is also protected by topology and a similar danger level.
- Maui Zone 4 - Functionally has no danger from eruption havening not been inundated with lava for at least 100,000 years. This makes it most similar to a Zone 9 on the island of Hawaiʻi.

The USGS Hawaiian Volcano Observatory maintains an FAQ intended to answer many of the questions that arise from its maps and their various uses.
