= Thyrocopa epicapna =

Scientific classification
- Kingdom: Animalia
- Phylum: Arthropoda
- Class: Insecta
- Order: Lepidoptera
- Family: Xyloryctidae
- Genus: Thyrocopa
- Species: T. epicapna

Binomial name
- Thyrocopa epicapna (Meyrick, 1883)

Synonyms
- Synomotis epicapna Meyrick, 1883; Thyrocopa pulverulenta Walsingham 1907

Species of moth

Thyrocopa epicapna is a moth of the family Xyloryctidae. It was first described by Edward Meyrick in 1883. It is endemic to the Hawaiian islands of Kauai, Lanai, Kahoolawe, Maui, Hawaii, and possibly Oahu.

The length of the forewings is 8–11 mm. Adults are on wing year round.
