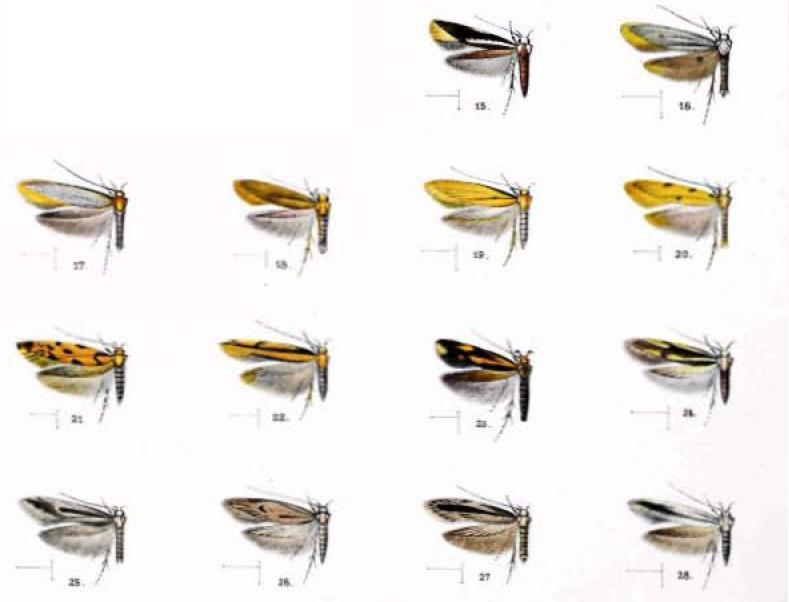
- Illustrations in Fauna Hawaiiensis; 15. Hyposmocoma subflavidella 16. Hyposmocoma auroargentea 17. Hyposmocoma illuminata 18. Hyposmocoma auripennis 19. Hyposmocoma rhabdophora 20. Hyposmocoma costimaculata 21. Hyposmocoma virgata 22. Hyposmocoma bilineata 23. Hyposmocoma haleakalae 24. Hyposmocoma lucifer 25. Hyposmocoma evanescens 26. Hyposmocoma ferricolor 27. Hyposmocoma impunctata 28. Hyposmocoma straminella

Scientific classification
- Domain: Eukaryota
- Kingdom: Animalia
- Phylum: Arthropoda
- Class: Insecta
- Order: Lepidoptera
- Family: Cosmopterigidae
- Genus: Hyposmocoma
- Species: H. lucifer

Binomial name
- Hyposmocoma lucifer Walsingham, 1907

= Hyposmocoma lucifer =

Species of moth

Hyposmocoma lucifer is a species of moth of the family Cosmopterigidae. It was first described by Lord Walsingham in 1907. It is endemic to the Hawaiian island of Molokai.
