= Thyrocopa neckerensis =

Scientific classification
- Domain: Eukaryota
- Kingdom: Animalia
- Phylum: Arthropoda
- Class: Insecta
- Order: Lepidoptera
- Family: Xyloryctidae
- Genus: Thyrocopa
- Species: T. neckerensis

Binomial name
- Thyrocopa neckerensis Medeiros, 2009

Species of moth

Thyrocopa neckerensis is a moth of the family Xyloryctidae. It was first described by Matthew J. Medeiros in 2009. It is endemic to Necker Island in the Northwestern Hawaiian Islands.

The length of the forewings is 7–8 mm. Adults are on wing at least in September.
