= Thyrocopa gigas =

Scientific classification
- Domain: Eukaryota
- Kingdom: Animalia
- Phylum: Arthropoda
- Class: Insecta
- Order: Lepidoptera
- Family: Xyloryctidae
- Genus: Thyrocopa
- Species: T. gigas

Binomial name
- Thyrocopa gigas (Butler, 1881)

Synonyms
- Depressaria gigas Butler, 1881

Species of moth

Thyrocopa gigas is a moth of the family Xyloryctidae. It was first described by Arthur Gardiner Butler in 1881. It is endemic to the Hawaiian islands of Kauai, Oahu, Molokai and Maui. However, it may be extinct on Oahu, where two females were collected in 1892 but no further specimens have been collected since then.

The length of the forewings is 17–23 mm. Adults are on wing at least from April to September.
