= Thyrocopa seminatella =

Scientific classification
- Domain: Eukaryota
- Kingdom: Animalia
- Phylum: Arthropoda
- Class: Insecta
- Order: Lepidoptera
- Family: Xyloryctidae
- Genus: Thyrocopa
- Species: T. seminatella

Binomial name
- Thyrocopa seminatella Walsingham, 1907

Species of moth

Thyrocopa seminatella is a moth of the family Xyloryctidae. It was first described by Lord Walsingham in 1907. It is endemic to the Hawaiian island of Kauai.

The length of the forewings is 10–14 mm. Adults are on wing year round.
