= Kaʻūpūlehu, Hawaii =

Former populated place on Hawaii island in Hawaii, United States

Kaʻūpūlehu is the site of a historic settlement on the west coast of Hawaiʻi island, the largest of the Hawaiian Islands. Devastated by a lava flow, the area is now the home of luxury hotels such as the Four Seasons Resort Hualalai.

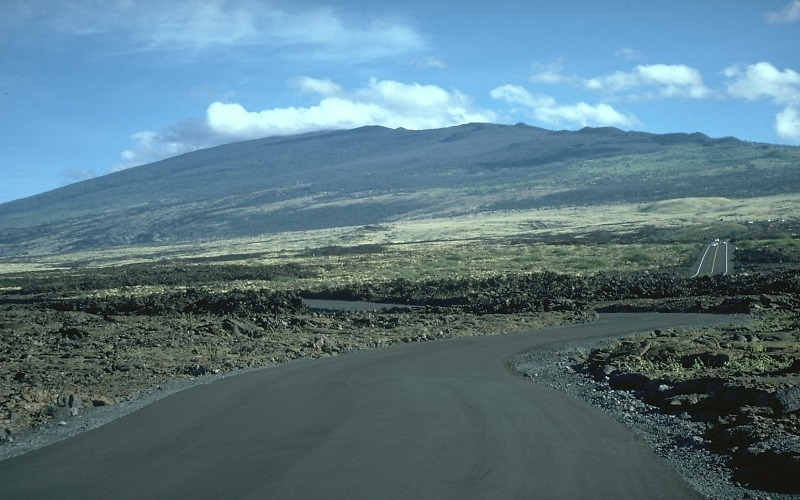
Hualālai from the area

== Geography ==
Kaʻūpūlehu is located at 19°49′56″N 155°59′8″W in the northern part of the Kona district. The name comes from Ka ʻulu pūlehu which means "the roasted breadfruit" in the Hawaiian language. Access is from the lower Hawaii Belt Road, known as Route 19 or Queen Kaʻahumanu Highway.

In 1800, the volcano Hualālai erupted and the resulting lava flow reached the sea near Kaʻūpūlehu. Oral histories tell of a bay and fishponds that were destroyed. The flow is named after Kaʻūpūlehu. The crater on the side of Hualālai resulting from the eruption is also given the name Kaʻūpūlehu, located at about 6,000 feet (1,800 m) elevation, 19°42′56″N 155°54′28″W.

== Capture of the Fair American ==
Capture of the Fair American
- Date: 1790
- Attack type: massacre
- Deaths: 4 killed, 1 captured
- Perpetrators: Kameʻeiamoku; Hawaiian warriors

In 1790, local chief Kameʻeiamoku met Captain Simon Metcalfe on the Eleanora who was spending the winter during a maritime fur trading mission. Something he did must have offended Metcalfe, who had Kameʻeiamoku flogged. This was to have severe consequences later. The Eleanora then sailed north to the island of Maui to trade and resupply. In retribution for stealing a boat and killing a watchman, Metcalfe fired his cannon at the villagers of Olowalu, killing and injuring hundreds.

About five or six weeks later the Eleanora's smaller tender Fair American, a schooner under command of his son Thomas Humphrey Metcalfe arrived. The Metcalfes had earlier agreed to rendezvous at Kealakekua Bay. Kameʻeiamoku was waiting for his revenge. The schooner's small crew of five were easily overwhelmed. Four were killed, including Thomas Metcalfe. The lone survivor was Isaac Davis. When King Kamehameha I found out about the incident another sailor, John Young, was captured by Kamehameha's men when he set ashore from the Eleanora to inquire about the Fair American. Kamehameha decided to spare the lives of Davis and Young, who became valued military advisors during his subsequent battles and negotiations with later visitors.

The muskets of the Fair American were salvaged and the schooner refloated. The Fair American, with its cannons operated by Davis and Young, led to the victory in the Battle of Kepaniwai back on Maui, and the eventual conquest of all the islands. Simon Metcalfe eventually left the island, not realizing that he had indirectly caused his own son's death.

== Kona village ==
The area was fairly uninhabited until Texas investor John H. Jackson constructed his Kona Village Resort in 1961. At first all equipment came in by boat, and then a small airstrip was built. Instead of the typical concrete tower, traditional island architecture was used in individual houses. The airstrip is now used as a heliport.

== Four Seasons Resort Hualalai ==
The Toronto-based Four Seasons chain opened a resort in 1996 at Kaʻūpūlehu. The resort makes use of natural materials indigenous to Hawaii, including rattan, bamboo and lava rock. It was among the 100 of Travel + Leisure's world's best resorts awards in a readers poll in 2007, 2008, and 2009, and ranked in several "top lists" by Zagat Surveys. Condé Nast Traveler placed the resort on their "Gold list" for best resorts since 2005.

As of 2009 Four Seasons Resort Hualalai was one of only three AAA Five Diamond Award winning hotels in Hawaii. A par-72 18-hole golf course was designed by Jack Nicklaus. Golf Magazine ranked the course one of the best in America to play in 2002 and it annually hosts the Champions Tour's Mitsubishi Electric Championship at Hualalai. Other amenities include spa services, five pools, and fitness facilities. Alan Wong had a restaurant at the resort from 2003 to 2008.

== Kūkiʻo ==
In 1999 another golf course and expensive vacation home development was built to the south called Kūkiʻo, and then expanded to the north in 2007. The original developer was the Discovery Land Company. The Kona Shuttle is a private membership-based airline which operates weekly flights to the resorts at Kaʻūpūlehu. Kona Shuttle flights are presently largely provided by KaiserAir. In the Hawaiian Language Kū kiʻo means "small pool of water". Fishing is controlled in the area.

== See also ==
- Ala Kahakai National Historic Trail
