= Thyrocopa spilobathra =

Scientific classification
- Kingdom: Animalia
- Phylum: Arthropoda
- Class: Insecta
- Order: Lepidoptera
- Family: Xyloryctidae
- Genus: Thyrocopa
- Species: T. spilobathra

Binomial name
- Thyrocopa spilobathra Meyrick, 1915

Species of moth

Thyrocopa spilobathra is a moth of the family Xyloryctidae. It was first described by Edward Meyrick in 1915. It is endemic to the Hawaiian island of Oahu. It may be extinct.

The length of the forewings is 8–9 mm. Adults are on wing at least in July.
