= Thyrocopa minor =

Scientific classification
- Domain: Eukaryota
- Kingdom: Animalia
- Phylum: Arthropoda
- Class: Insecta
- Order: Lepidoptera
- Family: Xyloryctidae
- Genus: Thyrocopa
- Species: T. minor

Binomial name
- Thyrocopa minor Walsingham, 1907

Species of moth

Thyrocopa minor is a moth of the family Xyloryctidae. It was first described by Lord Walsingham in 1907. It is endemic to the Hawaiian island of Molokai and possibly extinct.

The length of the forewings is about 9 mm. Adults are on the wing at least in June.
