= Thyrocopa kanaloa =

Scientific classification
- Domain: Eukaryota
- Kingdom: Animalia
- Phylum: Arthropoda
- Class: Insecta
- Order: Lepidoptera
- Family: Xyloryctidae
- Genus: Thyrocopa
- Species: T. kanaloa

Binomial name
- Thyrocopa kanaloa Medeiros, 2009

Species of moth

Thyrocopa kanaloa is a moth of the family Xyloryctidae. It was first described by Matthew J. Medeiros in 2009. It is endemic to Kahoolawe.
