= Thyrocopa alterna =

Scientific classification
- Domain: Eukaryota
- Kingdom: Animalia
- Phylum: Arthropoda
- Class: Insecta
- Order: Lepidoptera
- Family: Xyloryctidae
- Genus: Thyrocopa
- Species: T. alterna

Binomial name
- Thyrocopa alterna Walsingham, 1907

Synonyms
- Thyrocopa adumbrata Walsingham, 1907; Thyrocopa inermis Walsingham, 1907

Species of moth

Thyrocopa alterna is a moth belonging to the family Xyloryctidae. It was first described by Lord Walsingham in 1907. It is endemic to the Hawaiian islands of Maui and Hawaii.

The length of the forewings is 8–15 mm. Adults are on wing at least from May to November. Individuals from Maui generally are smaller than those from the island of Hawaii.
