= Thyrocopa kea =

Scientific classification
- Domain: Eukaryota
- Kingdom: Animalia
- Phylum: Arthropoda
- Class: Insecta
- Order: Lepidoptera
- Family: Xyloryctidae
- Genus: Thyrocopa
- Species: T. kea

Binomial name
- Thyrocopa kea Medeiros, 2009

Species of moth

Thyrocopa kea is a moth of the family Xyloryctidae. It was first described by Matthew J. Medeiros in 2009. It is endemic to the Hawaiian island of Kauai.

The length of the forewings is 12–20 mm. The fringe is sometimes lighter.
