= Thyrocopa kikaelekea =

Scientific classification
- Domain: Eukaryota
- Kingdom: Animalia
- Phylum: Arthropoda
- Class: Insecta
- Order: Lepidoptera
- Family: Xyloryctidae
- Genus: Thyrocopa
- Species: T. kikaelekea

Binomial name
- Thyrocopa kikaelekea Medeiros, 2008

Species of moth

Thyrocopa kikaelekea, a species of flightless moth from Hawaii in genus Thyrocopa, was recently discovered by entomologists at University of California, Berkeley and described in a 2008 paper.

The forewing length is 8–11 mm.
