= Thyrocopa usitata =

Scientific classification
- Kingdom: Animalia
- Phylum: Arthropoda
- Class: Insecta
- Order: Lepidoptera
- Family: Xyloryctidae
- Genus: Thyrocopa
- Species: T. usitata

Binomial name
- Thyrocopa usitata (Butler, 1881)

Synonyms
- Depressaria usitata Butler, 1881; Thyrocopa criminosa Meyrick, 1915; Thyrocopa librodes Meyrick, 1915; Thyrocopa sucosa Meyrick, 1915

Species of moth

Thyrocopa usitata is a moth of the family Xyloryctidae. It was first described by Arthur Gardiner Butler in 1881. It is endemic to the Hawaiian islands of Kauai, Oahu and Hawaii.

The length of the forewings is 7–11 mm. Adults are on wing year round.

A larva was collected from rotting bark of Acacia koa.
