= Thyrocopa indecora =

Scientific classification
- Domain: Eukaryota
- Kingdom: Animalia
- Phylum: Arthropoda
- Class: Insecta
- Order: Lepidoptera
- Family: Xyloryctidae
- Genus: Thyrocopa
- Species: T. indecora

Binomial name
- Thyrocopa indecora (Butler, 1881)

Synonyms
- Depressaria indecora Butler, 1881; Depressaria lactea Butler, 1881; Thyrocopa lactea; Depressaria argentea Butler, 1881; Thyrocopa argentea; Thyrocopa tessellatella Walsingham, 1907

Species of moth

Thyrocopa indecora is a moth of the family Xyloryctidae. It was first described by Arthur Gardiner Butler in 1881. It is endemic to the Hawaiian islands of Oahu, Maui and Hawaii.

The length of the forewings is 7–15 mm.
