= Polynesian Adventure Tours =

Tour and transportation company in Hawaii, US

Polynesian Adventure Tours (PolyAd)
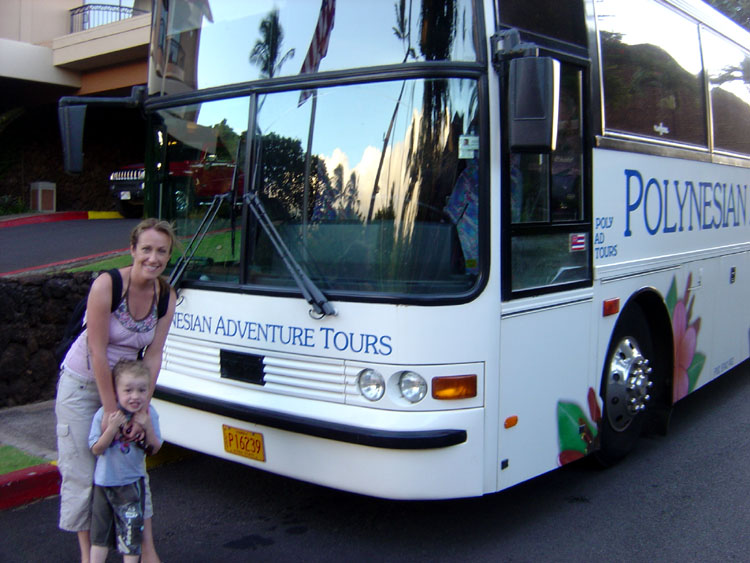
- Polynesian Adventure Tours bus in Maui
- Founded: 1977
- Headquarters: 2965 N. Nimitz Hwy, Honolulu, Hawaii
- Service area: Oahu, Maui, Hawaii (island), Kauai
- Service type: Tour bus service, Coach (bus), airport shuttle, school bus contractor
- Alliance: International Motorcoach Group
- Chief executive: Terry Fischer
- Website: polyad.com

Polynesian Adventure Tours, Inc. (also known as PolyAd) is a tour and transportation company in Hawaii. PolyAd was founded in 1977 by Bob George and his partner Don Brown who started the company as an operator of van sightseeing tours in Waikiki. PolyAd specializes in charters, commercial and personalized tours that utilize drivers as narrators and guides. In 2017 PolyAd was acquired by the same principals as California-based Transportation Charter Services (TCS). Polynesian Adventure Tours maintains offices on Oahu, Maui, Kauai, The Big Island and provides tours to Hawaiian landmarks.

Polynesian Adventure Tours is also affiliated with Luau Kalamaku, a theatrical hula show and dinner experience held at Kilohana Plantation in Lihue, Kauai.

== History ==
Polynesian Adventure Tours was founded in 1977 by Bob George and Don Brown, with a small fleet of vans. The founders sold the company in 1986, to Atak Management Corporation, owned by Japanese-American businessman, Shig Katayama. Don Brown left the company and Bob George remained as Director of Sales. The company's fleet was expanded with the addition of motorcoaches and minibuses on Oahu, and bases operating sightseeing vans on the islands of Hawaii, Maui and Kauai.

In August 1996, the US Bankruptcy Court for the District of Hawaii approved the sale of Gray Line Hawaii, Ltd.'s PUC-issued authority "to provide services as a common carrier by motor vehicle in the over-twenty-five passenger classifications on the islands of Hawaii, Maui, and Kauai" to Polynesian Adventure Tours, Inc. This allowed Polyad to further expand its motorcoach and minibus fleet to the islands outside of Oahu.

In October 2017, Poly Ad was acquired by the same principals as Orange County, California based Transportation Charter Services (TCS) from Norwegian Cruise Lines. Shortly thereafter, the company began a comprehensive fleet modernization program, including the acquisition of new, luxury mini-coaches for use in a new category of premium tours

== Awards ==
Polynesian Adventure Tours – Gray Line Hawaii has been recognized as Metro Magazine's 10 Innovative Motorcoach Operators in 2006 and is consistently in the Top 50 Motorcoach Operators list. The company was also the recipient of Gray Line Worldwide's Market Development Award in 2008.
