= Thyrocopa leonina =

Scientific classification
- Domain: Eukaryota
- Kingdom: Animalia
- Phylum: Arthropoda
- Class: Insecta
- Order: Lepidoptera
- Family: Xyloryctidae
- Genus: Thyrocopa
- Species: T. leonina

Binomial name
- Thyrocopa leonina Walsingham, 1907

Species of moth

Thyrocopa leonina is a moth of the family Xyloryctidae. It was first described by Lord Walsingham in 1907. It is endemic to the Hawaiian island of Lanai. It is possibly extinct.

The length of the forewings is about 9 mm. Adults are on wing at least in February. The ground color of the forewings is brown. The hindwings are very light brown. The fringe is also very light brown.
