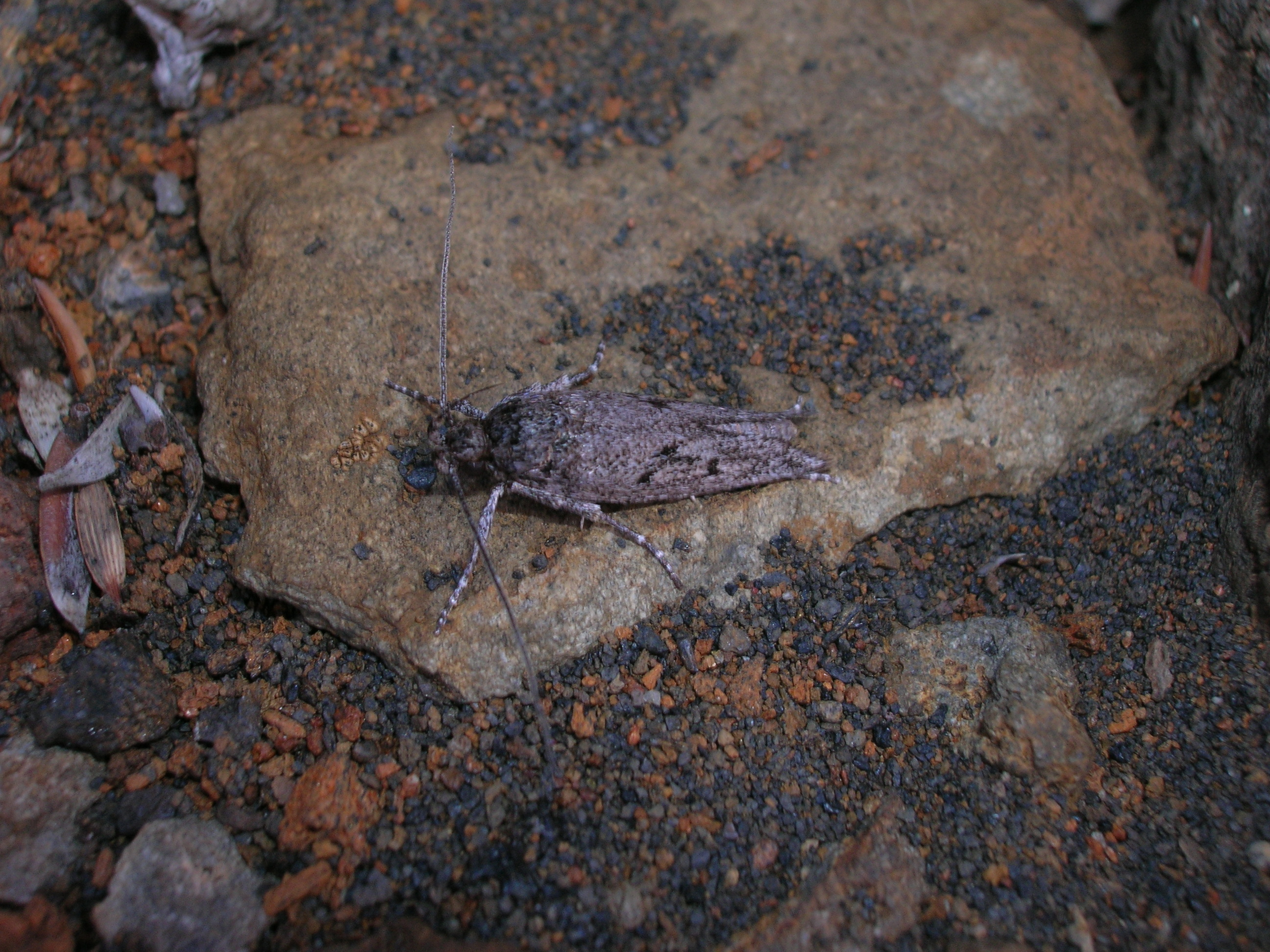
- At Haleakala National Park; Maui, Hawaii

Scientific classification
- Kingdom: Animalia
- Phylum: Arthropoda
- Clade: Pancrustacea
- Class: Insecta
- Order: Lepidoptera
- Family: Xyloryctidae
- Genus: Thyrocopa
- Species: T. apatela

Binomial name
- Thyrocopa apatela (Walsingham, 1907)

Synonyms
- Hodegia apatela Walsingham, 1907; Thyrocopa mediomaculata Walsingham, 1907

= Thyrocopa apatela =

Species of moth

Thyrocopa apatela, the grasshopper moth or Haleakala flightless moth, is a species of brachypterous (flightless) moth from the Hawaiian island of Maui.

== Description ==
Males and females are both short-winged, and their appearance resembles dried leaves. Similarly, they travel by using the wind and have the ability to hop up to ten times their body length. Both the larvae and adults feed on the endemic shrub Dubautia menziesii.

== Habitat ==
The species gained its common name as it resides on the summit of Haleakala in the Aeolian zone. These moths shelter amongst debris blown by the breeze.It is here as well that they lay eggs and the hatched larvae dwell.
