= Hualālai =

Active volcano in the Hawaiian Islands

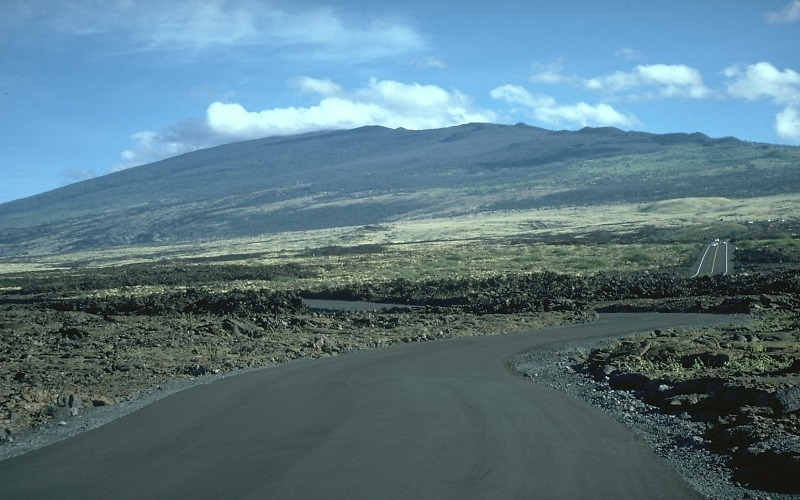
- View of Hualālai over 1800 lava flow

Highest point
- Elevation: 8,271 ft (2,521 m)
- Prominence: 3,071 ft (936 m)
- Coordinates: 19°41′32″N 155°52′02″W

Naming
- Language of name: Hawaiian language
- Pronunciation: Hawaiian pronunciation: [huəˈlaːlei]

Geography
- Location within Hawaii
- Location: Hawaiʻi, U.S.
- Parent range: Hawaiian Islands
- Topo map: USGS Hualālai

Geology
- Rock age(s): Oldest-dated rock: 128,000 BP; Estimated: over 300,000 years
- Mountain type: Shield volcano
- Volcanic zone: Hawaiian-Emperor seamount chain
- Last eruption: 1800 to 1801

Climbing
- Easiest route: Multiple trails exist.

Hualālai (pronounced [huwəˈlaːlɐi] in Hawaiian) is an active shield volcano on the island of Hawaiʻi in the Hawaiian Islands. It is the westernmost, third-youngest and the third-most active of the five volcanoes that form the island of Hawaiʻi, following Kīlauea and the much larger Mauna Loa. Its peak stands 8,271 feet (2,521 m) above sea level. Hualālai is estimated to have risen above sea level about 300,000 years ago. Despite maintaining a very low level of activity since its last eruption in 1801, and being unusually inactive for the last 2,000 years, Hualālai is still considered active, and is expected to erupt again sometime in the next 100 years. The relative unpreparedness of the residents in the area caused by the lull in activity would worsen an eruption's consequences.

The area near Hualālai has been inhabited for centuries by Hawaiian natives, dating back to before recorded history. The coast to its west in particular had several royal complexes. The volcano is also important ecologically, is home to many rare species and several nature reserves near the summit, and is a popular hiking attraction. Today the coast near Hualālai is dotted by vacation resorts, some built on historic flows, and a National Historical Park.

== Geology ==
=== Structural features ===
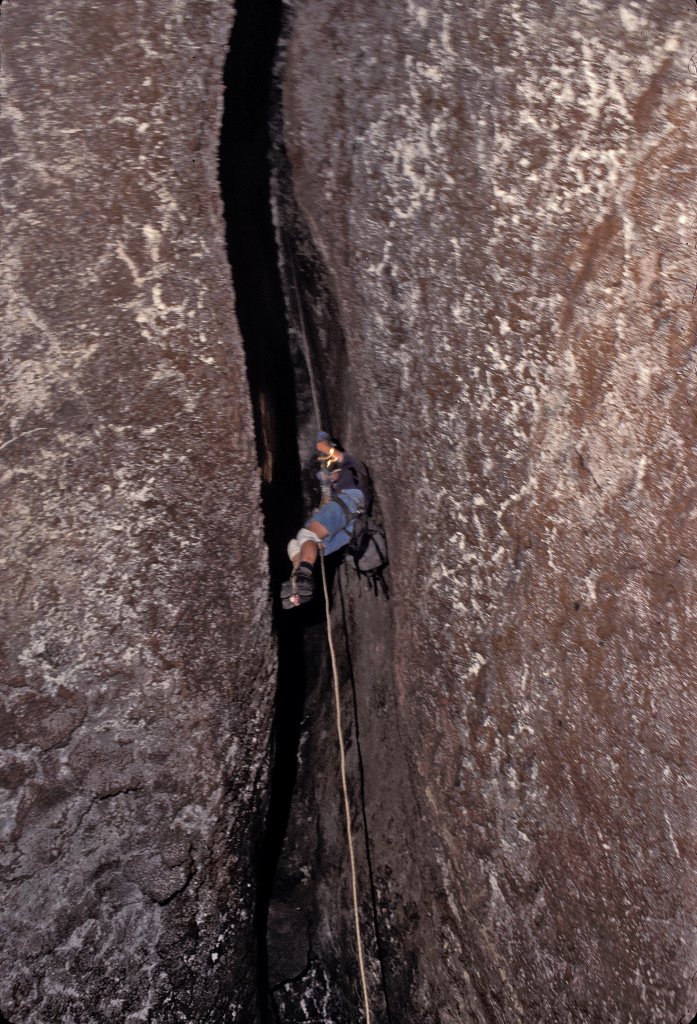
An expedition down a lava conduit in Hualālai volcano

Hualālai stands at 8,271 ft (2,521 m) with a prominence of 3,071 ft (936 m). It is the westernmost of the five major volcanoes that form the island of Hawaiʻi. Being in the post-shield stage of development, Hualālai is overall much rougher in shape and structure than the more youthful Mauna Loa and Kīlauea. Hualālai's structure is denoted by three rift zones: a well-developed one approximately 50° to the northwest, a moderately developed one to the southeast, and a poorly developed one trending northward about 3 mi (5 km) east of the summit. Over 100 cinder and spatter cones are arranged along these rift zones. Hualālai has no summit caldera, although there is a collapse crater about 0.3 mi (0.48 km) across atop a small lava shield. Much of the southern slope (above the modern town of Kailua-Kona) consists of lava flows covered by a layer of volcanic ash from 10 to 100 cm (4 to 39 in) thick. Of the volcanoes on the island, it is the third-tallest, third-youngest, third-most active, and second-smallest, making up just 7% of the island.

A major subfeature of Hualālai is Puʻu Waʻawaʻa, Hawaiian for "many-furrowed hill", a volcanic cone standing 372 m (1,220 ft) tall and measuring over 1.6 km (1 mi) in diameter. It extends for 9 km (6 mi), and has a prominence of 275 m (902 ft), north of the summit at 19°46′15″N 155°49′56″W. The cone is constructed of trachyte, a type of volcanic lava not found on other volcanoes on the island. Trachyte flows move more slowly than the typically "runny" Hawaiian lavas due to its high (over 62%) silica composition (typical basalt is only 50% silica). Geologists hypothesize that Puʻu Waʻawaʻa originally formed during a pumice eruption a little over 100,000 years ago, and has continued to build since then, with at least three distinct trachyte flows recognized. The eruptions, although partially covered by flows from Hualālai and Mauna Loa, have built a distinctive structure known as the Puʻu Anahulu ridge.

Hualālai's westward-facing flank forms a large underwater slump known as the North Kona slump. An area of about 1,000 km^{2} (390 sq mi), the slump consists of an intricate formation of beaches and scarps 2,000 to 4,500 m (6,600 to 14,800 ft) below the waterline. This area was explored more closely in a 2001 joint Japan-United States project to explore the volcano's flanks, utilizing the remotely operated vehicle (ROV) Kaikō. Data collected showed that the lava flows there originated in shallow water 500 to 1,000 m (1,600 to 3,300 ft) deep, and that unlike similar slumps at other volcanoes, the slump at Hualālai formed gradually.

Hualālai is a known source for xenoliths, rock from the Earth's mantle that have been brought up in lava flows. Many prehistoric deposits, as well as those from the 1801 event, contain xenoliths of large size and abundant quantity.

=== History ===
Hualālai is the westernmost of the five volcanoes making up Hawaiʻi island

Lava attributed to a shield-stage Hualālai has been found just offshore of its northwest rift zone. Tholeiitic basalt, indicative of the submarine subphase of the volcano's construction, has been found in wells driven into the volcano at a depth of 75 ft (23 m). These lavas persisted until an estimated 130,000 years ago. Hualālai entered the post-shield stage, the stage it is now in, about 100,000 years ago. Pumice and trachyte eruptions at Puʻu Waʻawaʻa may be a sign of this change.

Geological mapping of Hualālai indicates that as much as 80% of its surface has been topped by lava flows during the last 5,000 years, entirely composed of alkalic shield basalt. More than half of this is under 3,000 years old, and about 12% is less than 1,000 years old. Between 1700 and 2016, eruptions originated from six vents; four of these lava flows poured into the sea to the west coast.

== Eruption history ==
Hualālai is the third most active volcano on the island of Hawaiʻi, behind Kīlauea and Mauna Loa. Although the two larger volcanos have each erupted over 150 times in the last 1,000 years, Hualālai has done so only thrice. Activity seems to recur at the volcano every 200 to 300 years.

A recent calm period, with almost no earthquake or magmatic activity at Hualālai, has seen the growth of homes, businesses, and resorts on its flanks. The most recent major activity at the volcano was in 1929, when an intense earthquake swarm rocked it, most likely caused by magmatic action near its peak. Although it has been relatively placid in the recent past, Hualālai is still potentially active, and is expected to erupt again in the next 100 years.

=== Lava stratigraphy ===
The United States Geological Survey (USGS) has divided the exposed lava flows and tephra erupted by Hualālai volcano during the last 112,000 years into 419 rock units of eight chronostratigraphic age groups. These are summarized in the table below:

Lava stratigraphy
Age Group	Age (years before present)	Rock type	Surface area (percent)	Number of rock units	Location of exposures	Comments
8	less than 227	alkali basalt	6	3	northwest flank	Vent cinder deposits with black pahoehoe basalt lava flows formed during AD 1800–1801 eruption. Five vents along NW rift zone. Abundant xenoliths of ultramafic intrusive plutonic rocks.
7	200–700	alkali basalt	3	4	southern flank	Vent lava spatter and lava flows, cinders and tuff at Waha Pele. Spatter cone erupted pahoehoe and ʻaʻā basalt lava flows. Cone collapsed causing violent phreatic eruptions of tuff. Lava flow eruption resumed building larger cone, with eruption of long ʻaʻā lava flows.
6	750-1,500	alkali basalt	8	14	mostly central summit area and southeast flank	Dark grey to black vent lava spatter (including a 650-meter-long spatter rampart), cinders, ʻaʻā and pahoehoe basalt lava flows, including Hualalai's longest lava flow (22 km). Collapse of vents produced pit craters. Hawaiian, Strombolian, and sub-Plinian activity.
5	1,500–3,000	alkali basalt	38	49	mostly northern flank	Spatter deposits, ʻaʻā and pahoehoe basalt lava flows. Very active 2,400–1,900 years before present.
4	3,000–5,000	alkali basalt	25	98	mostly northern flank and summit	Spatter deposits, ʻaʻā and pahoehoe basalt lava flows.
3	5,000–10,000	alkali basalt with minor amounts of picritic basalt, hawaiite and ankaramite	15	185	mostly southern flank and summit	Spatter deposits, extensively weathered ʻaʻā and pahoehoe lava flows.
2	10,000–25,000	alkali basalt with minor amounts of picritic basalt, hawaiite and ankaramite	5	63	northeastern and southwestern flanks	Lava spatter, cinders, extensively weathered ʻaʻā and pahoehoe lava flows and palagonite tuff. Spatter and cinders contain abundant xenoliths of mafic and ultramafic plutonic rocks.
1	more than 100,000	trachyte	less than 1	3	northeastern flank	Trachyte cone of Puʻu Waʻawaʻa (current prominence approximately 430 meters). Block and ʻaʻā trachyte lava flow of Puʻu Anahulu and trachyte pyroclastic deposits. 5.5 km^{3} in volume, the largest-volume single eruption on Hawaiʻi (Big island). K-Ar age is 106,000 ± 6,000 years before present.

=== 1800–1801 eruption ===
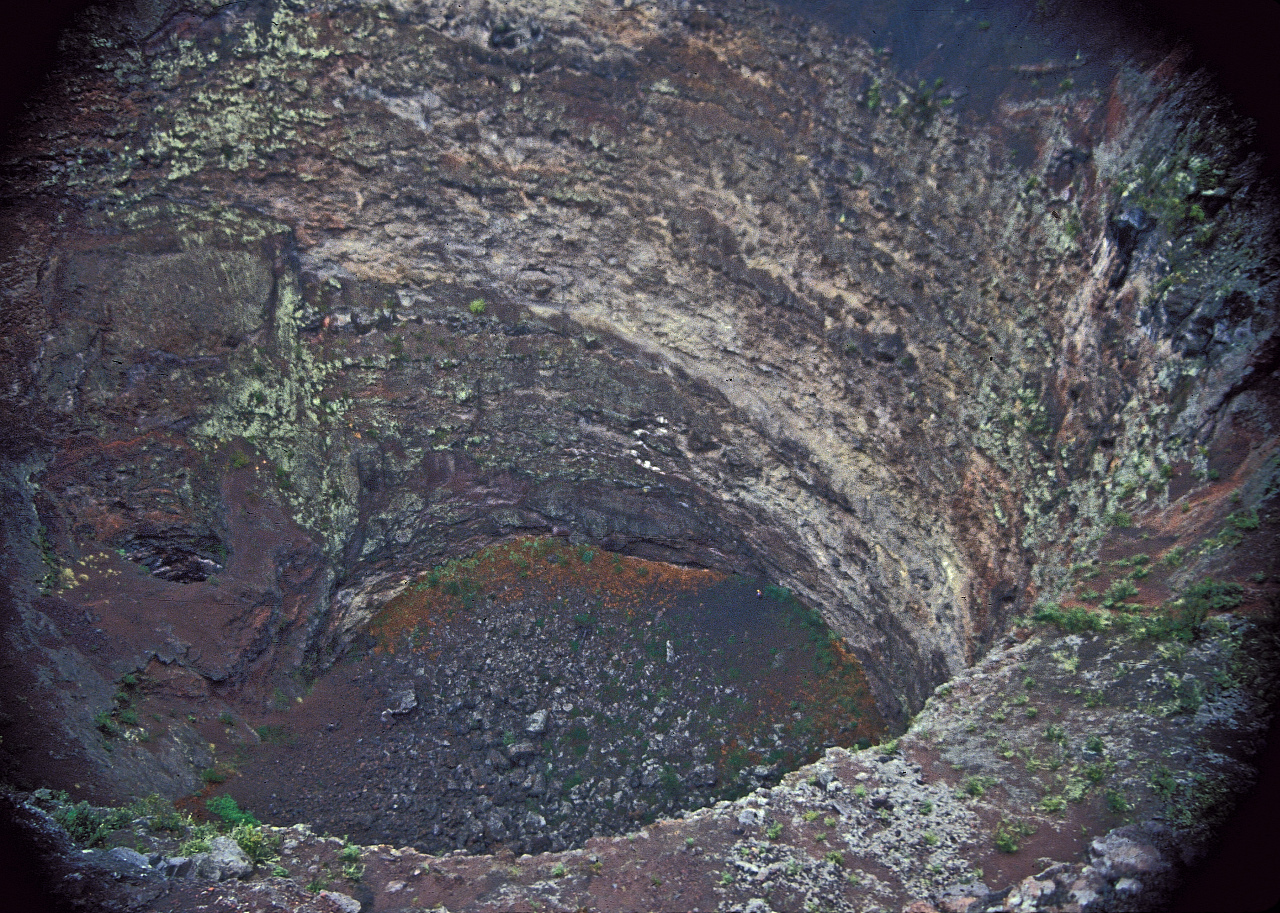
Na One pit crater of Hualālai volcano

Hualālai last erupted in 1800–1801. This eruption produced very fluid alkalic basalt lava flows that entered the ocean off the western tip of Hawaiʻi island. Although five vents were active at the time, only two produced flows that eventually reached the ocean. The total output volume of the flow is estimated at over 300,000,000 m^{3} (0.072 cu mi). One volcanic vent, situated high on the slope, produced a large ʻaʻā flow, dubbed the Kaʻūpūlehu flow, that reached the ocean as two distinct lobes. On its way down, it overran a village and a valuable 3 mi (5 km) fishing pond. There is a local legend that after the failure of several offerings of animals and other items to the gods, the flow was finally stopped when Kamehameha I threw a lock of his own hair into the fire. The Ka'ūpūlehu flow is also known for the particularly large quantity of mafic and ultramafic xenoliths that came up with it.

The other major outflow from the event reached the sea south of Kiholo Bay, destroying the village of Kaʻūpūlehu. This 1801 flow, known as the Huʻehuʻe flow, formed Keahole Point where Kona International Airport is now located, 11 km (6.8 mi) north of Kailua-Kona. The eruption at Hualālai is believed to have been concurrent with an eruption at the nearby Mauna Loa. It is theorized that in the near past, Hualālai has been active around the same time as both Mauna Loa and Kilauea, although precise dating is impossible.

=== Recent activity ===
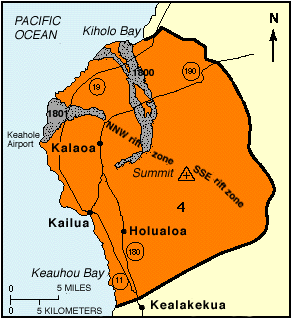
Hualālai is indicated as threat level 4 by the USGS in this mapping. The two gray areas are the two major outflows from the 1800–1801 event.

A severe earthquake swarm shook the volcano in 1929, lasting about a month. This caused $100,000 worth of damage to the Kona district ($1.2 million as of 2010), and two earthquakes with magnitudes of 5.5 and 6.5 were felt as far away as Honolulu. This was probably caused by magma movement near the surface, but there was no surface activity or eruption.

The 2006 Kiholo Bay earthquake, with epicenter just to the north in Kiholo Bay near Māhukona, caused much damage in the area.

=== Future monitoring ===
Hualālai is expected to erupt again in the near future, as a 200- to 300-year estimated pause in activity is coming to an end. This presents a distinct hazard to the communities around it; for example, in the event of an eruption similar to the 1801 event, Kailua-Kona, which is 15 mi (24 km) from the volcano's summit, could be covered completely in a matter of hours. According to the USGS lava-flow hazard zones, on a scale of 1 to 9, all of Hualālai is listed as threat level 4. For comparison, almost all of Kīlauea and Mauna Loa is listed as threat levels 1 through 3. The volcano's flanks do not pose a lower threat to the population than the area near the rift zones because the distance is short and the slopes are steep; lava poses as much of a threat as it does near its source. The 2018 U.S. Geological Survey National Volcanic Threat Assessment classified Hualālai as a high threat volcano, with an overall threat score of 109, and ranked it 23rd among United States volcanoes most likely to threaten lives and infrastructure.

Since 1971, the Hawaiian Volcano Observatory has maintained a seismic recording station 3 km (1.9 mi) east of Hualālai's summit to monitor the volcano. During this time, not a single earthquake swarm or harmonic tremor, indicative of activity at the volcano, has occurred. Hualālai is also monitored by several other instruments, including one continuous GPS instrument and several instruments on the flanks of adjacent volcanoes. In addition, the Hawaiian Volcano Observatory uses GPS to measure slight changes in tilt and slope of Hualālai, indicative of magmatic movement.

Although Hualālai does experience several magnitude-4 earthquakes per year, these are attributed to a deep source off the coast of the north-western rift zone and are not related to the movement of magma.

== Human history ==
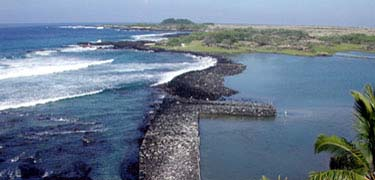
The Kaloko fishpond

Hualālai has been a home to native people since ancient times. Centuries ago, the Ahu A Umi Heiau was built on the dry plateau east of the mountain. The Kaloko-Honokōhau National Historical Park lies on the shore west of Hualālai, over the site of an ancient Hawaiian settlement. Although it is called kekaha ʻaʻole wai (lands without water), the rugged volcanic terrain attracted much sea life, making it an appealing place to settle. There are two main attractions within the park: the Kaloko fishpond, an area of loko kuapa (rockwall fishponds) constructed of interlocking rocks across a natural embayment on the coast, and Honokōhau, a former extensive settlement on the south side of the park.

"Outside the (royal) enclosure, by the edge of the sea, was a spring called Ki'ope ... It was a gathering place for those who went swimming and a place where the surf rolled in and dashed on land when it was rough. It was deep enough there for boats to land when the tide was high".

— John Papa Īʻī, court attendant of Kamehameha II.

Kamakahonu, Holualoa Bay, and Keauhou Bay were favored retreats of Hawaiian royalty long before the westernization of Hawaii. It was here that Kamehameha I rested after his eight-year campaign to unite the Hawaiian isles. His death in 1819 triggered social chaos. Mokuaikaua Church, built for missionaries in 1837 of lava rock and crushed coral, still stands today. Huliheʻe Palace, where many of Hawaii's last kings spent their time, has been maintained as a museum since 1927.

Today, the coast west of Hualālai is a popular location for vacation resorts, since the rain shadow of the mountain causes many sunny days. The first, Kona Village resort, was built in 1961. Since then the Four Seasons Resort and the Kūkiʻo golf course and vacation home complex have also been built on the 1800 flow. Both the Kona Village Resort and the Four Seasons Resort were damaged by the tsunami generated by the 2011 Sendai earthquake. The Hawaii Belt Road traverses the western slopes with an upper route called the Mamalahoa Highway and lower route named for Queen Kaʻahumanu.

Much of the Kona coffee crop grows on Hualālai's western slope near the town of Holualoa. The family of early coffee merchant Henry Nicholas Greenwell owned a large ranch on the western side of the volcano. The road from Kailua-Kona up the slopes of Hualālai is named for Frank "Palani" Greenwell. Hawaii Route 200 known as the Saddle Road, crosses the plateau north of Hualālai, where the Pohakuloa Training Area provides a remote training ground for the United States Army and United States Marine Corps.

== Ecology and environment ==
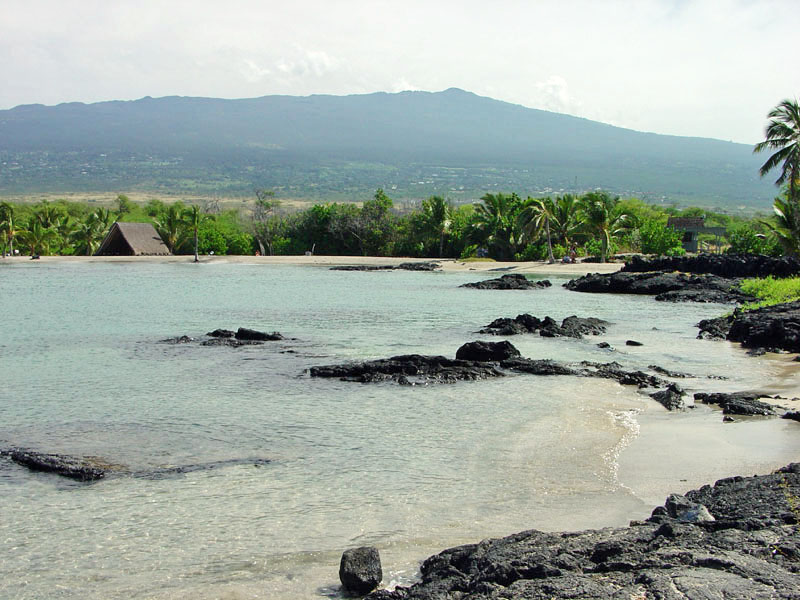
Hualālai seen from Honokōhau

Although some of Hualālai is bare volcanic rock, most of it is covered by some form of vegetation. Bushes, ferns, and grass are common, and even a few ōhiʻa lehua trees (Metrosideros polymorpha) grow along the summit. Many of the collapse craters in particular have vegetation, and a few even have respectably-sized "vertical forests" inside, including several eucalyptus tree groves. The volcano is populated by many birds and animals; the coast in particular attracts many fish and sea-dependent animals, such as the green sea turtle (Chelonia mydas) and the black-winged stilt (Himantopus himantopus). Hualālai averages 18.27 in (46 cm) of rainfall per year. The summit gets more rain than the coast and is typically obscured in heavy cloud cover and vog.

Several ecological reserves lie on the flanks of Hualālai. The Puʻu Waʻa Waʻa forest sanctuary was established in 1992 (along with the Laupahoehoe sister reserve on Mauna Kea) as a testbed for long term ecological research about Hawaiian moist forest and dry forest biomes, and lies within a mile of the volcano's summit on its northwestern flank. Elevation differs from sea level near the coastal edge to 6,300 ft (1,920 m) near the summit. Median annual rainfall is about 46.7 in (1,186 mm). Plentiful lava flows from the 19th century provide unique niches for vegetative and soil growth in the region. The southern section of the reserve, closest to the summit, has been split into a bird sanctuary.

The Honuaula forest reserve on the southwestern flank of the volcano at 19°30′25″N 155°54′41″W, preserves an extensive koa (Acacia koa) forest stand, with smaller Naio (Myoporum sandwicense) and Māmane (Sophora chrysophylla) trees and an undergrowth of ʻĀkala (Rubus hawaiensis) and various ferns. The reserve measures 655 acres (265 ha) and protects an ecosystem that has since been largely deforested in the surrounding area. The Wai Aha spring reserve on the lower slopes of the mountain is somewhat swampy and is home to the flowering evergreen ōhiʻa (Metrosideros polymorpha), the woody climber ʻIeʻie (Freycinetia arborea), and a dense undergrowth of ʻAmaʻu (Sadleria cyatheoides).

== See also ==
- List of mountain peaks of the United States
  - List of volcanoes in the United States
    - List of mountain peaks of Hawaii
- Evolution of Hawaiian volcanoes
- Hawaii hotspot
- Hawaiian–Emperor seamount chain
