= Haleakalā =

Massive shield volcano in Hawaii

- East Maui Volcano
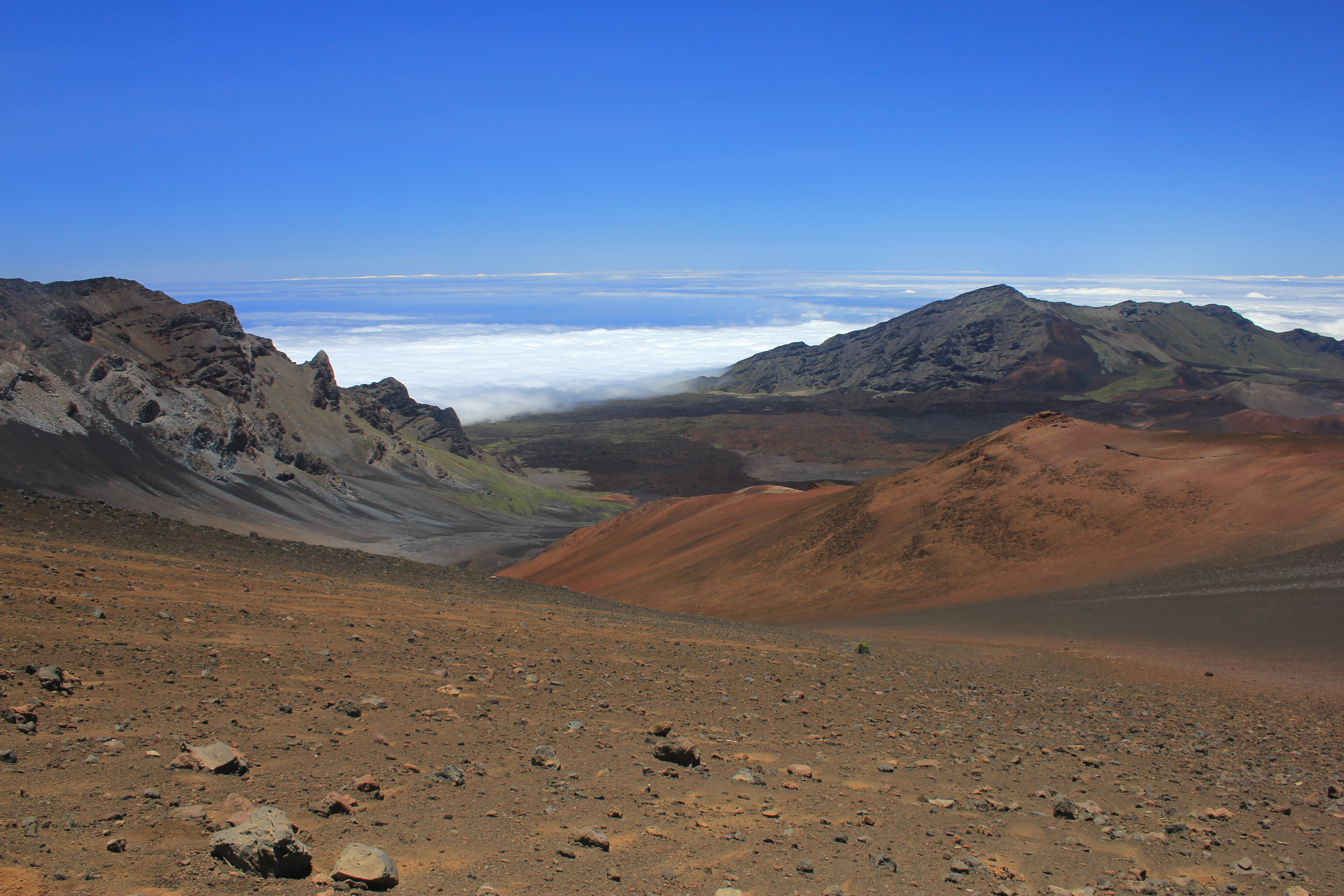
- Haleakalā crater

Highest point
- Elevation: 10,023 ft (3,055 m)
- Prominence: 10,023 ft (3,055 m)
- Isolation: 76 mi (123 km)
- Listing: Highest ocean islands 18th; World most prominent peak 85th; US most prominent peaks 10th; Ribu
- Coordinates: 20°42′35″N 156°15′12″W

Geography
- Location within Hawaii
- Location: Maui, Hawaii, U.S.
- Parent range: Hawaiian Islands
- Topo map: USGS Kilohana (HI)

Geology
- Rock age(s): <1.0 Ma, Pleistocene epoch
- Mountain type: Shield volcano
- Volcanic zone: Hawaiian–Emperor seamount chain
- Last eruption: between 1480 and 1600

Climbing
- Easiest route: paved highway

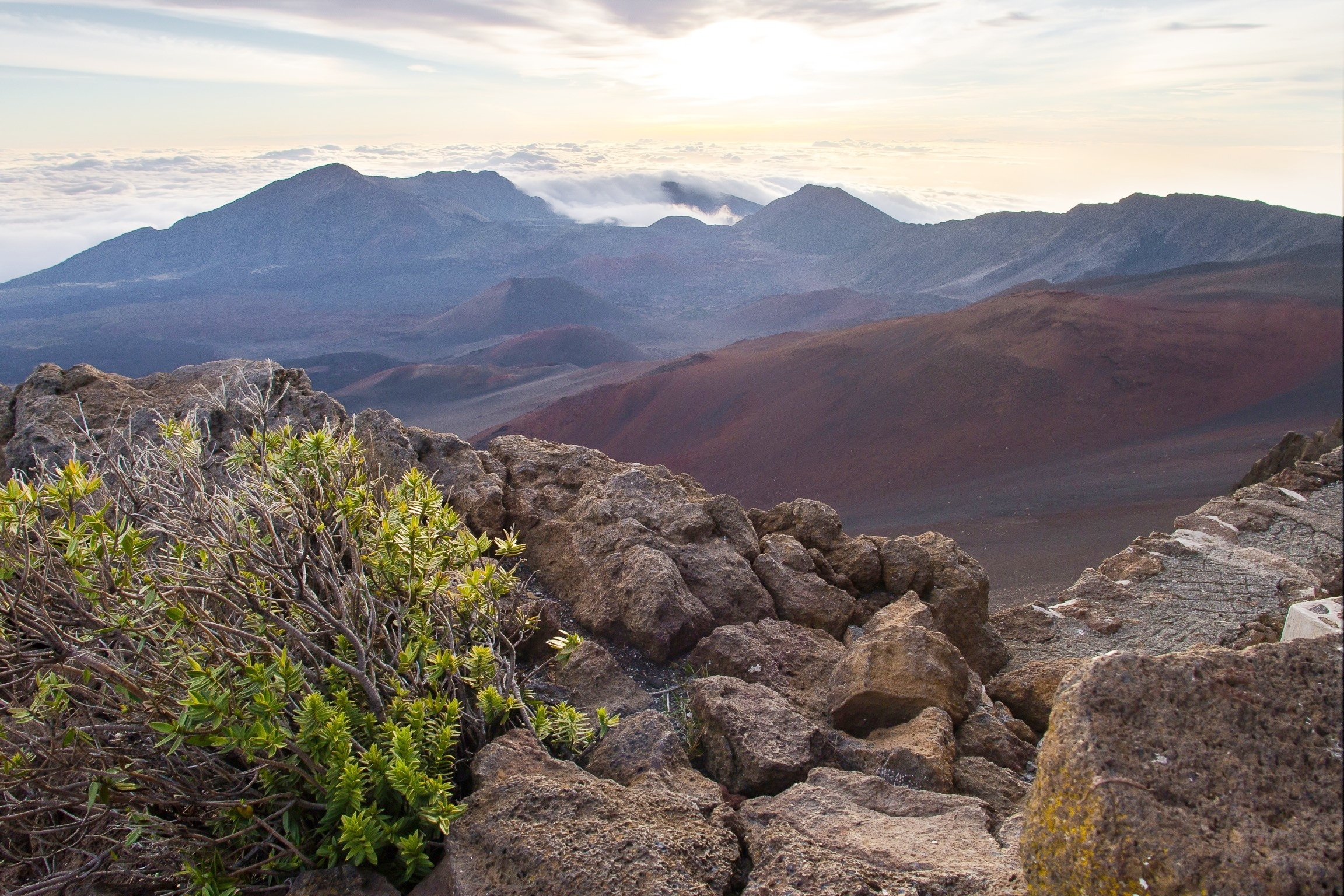
Sunrise at Haleakalā

Haleakalā (/ˌhɑːliˌɑːkəˈlɑː/; Hawaiian: Hawaiian pronunciation: [ˈhɐlɛˈjɐkəˈlaː]), or the East Maui Volcano, is a massive, active shield volcano that forms more than 75% of the Hawaiian Island of Maui. The western 25% of the island is formed by another volcano, Mauna Kahalawai, also referred to as the West Maui Mountains.

The tallest peak of Haleakalā ("house of the sun"), at 10,023 feet (3,055 m), is Puʻu ʻUlaʻula (Red Hill). From the summit one looks down into a massive depression some 11.25 mi (18.11 km) across, 3.2 mi (5.1 km) wide, and nearly 800 m (2,600 ft) deep. The surrounding walls are steep and the interior mostly barren-looking with a scattering of volcanic cones.

== History ==
Early Hawaiians applied the name Haleakalā ("house of the sun") to the general mountain. Haleakalā is also the name of a peak on the southwestern edge of Kaupō Gap. In Hawaiian folklore, the depression (crater) at the summit of Haleakalā was home to the grandmother of the demigod Māui. According to the legend, Māui's grandmother helped him capture the sun and force it to slow its journey across the sky in order to lengthen the day.

== Geology ==
Haleakalā started forming 2 million years ago and built a massive shield volcano along 3 rift zones that was once broken by a central caldera. Haleakalā is currently in the Rejuvenated Stage of Volcanism and has produced numerous eruptions in the last 30,000 years, including ten eruptions in the past 1,000 years and at least one in the last 400–600 years, making it the only active volcano on the island of Maui. This volcanic activity has been along two rift zones: the southwest and east. These two rift zones together form an arc that extends from La Perouse Bay on the southwest, through the Haleakalā Crater, and to Hāna to the east. The east rift zone continues under the ocean beyond the east coast of Maui as Haleakalā Ridge, making the combined rift zones one of the longest in the Hawaiian Islands chain. In its prime, Haleakalā may have reached a height of 12,000 feet (3,700 m) before water and wind erosion, and possibly glaciers, began to carve two large river valleys out of the rim. Eventually, these valleys formed gaps that merged at the volcano summit to create a crater-like basin. A third rift zone exists on a North/Northwest trend that hasn't seen any recent volcanic activity.

Haleakalā, also known as East Maui Volcano, was previously thought to have last erupted around 1790, based largely on comparisons of maps made during the voyages of La Perouse and George Vancouver. In 1999, the U.S. Geological Survey published in a column that radiocarbon dating indicated that the last eruption was more likely to have taken place sometime between 1480 and 1600. These last flows from the southwest rift zone of Haleakalā make up the large lava deposits of the Ahihi Kina`u/La Perouse Bay area of South Maui.

The Haleakalā crater is not volcanic in origin, as it formed when the headwalls of two large erosional valleys merged at the summit of the volcano. These valleys formed the two large gaps — Koʻolau on the north side and Kaupō on the south — on either side of the depression.

Macdonald, Abbott, & Peterson state it this way:

Haleakalā is far smaller than many volcanic craters (calderas); there is an excellent chance that it is not extinct, but only dormant; and strictly speaking, it is not of volcanic origin, beyond the fact that it exists in a volcanic mountain.

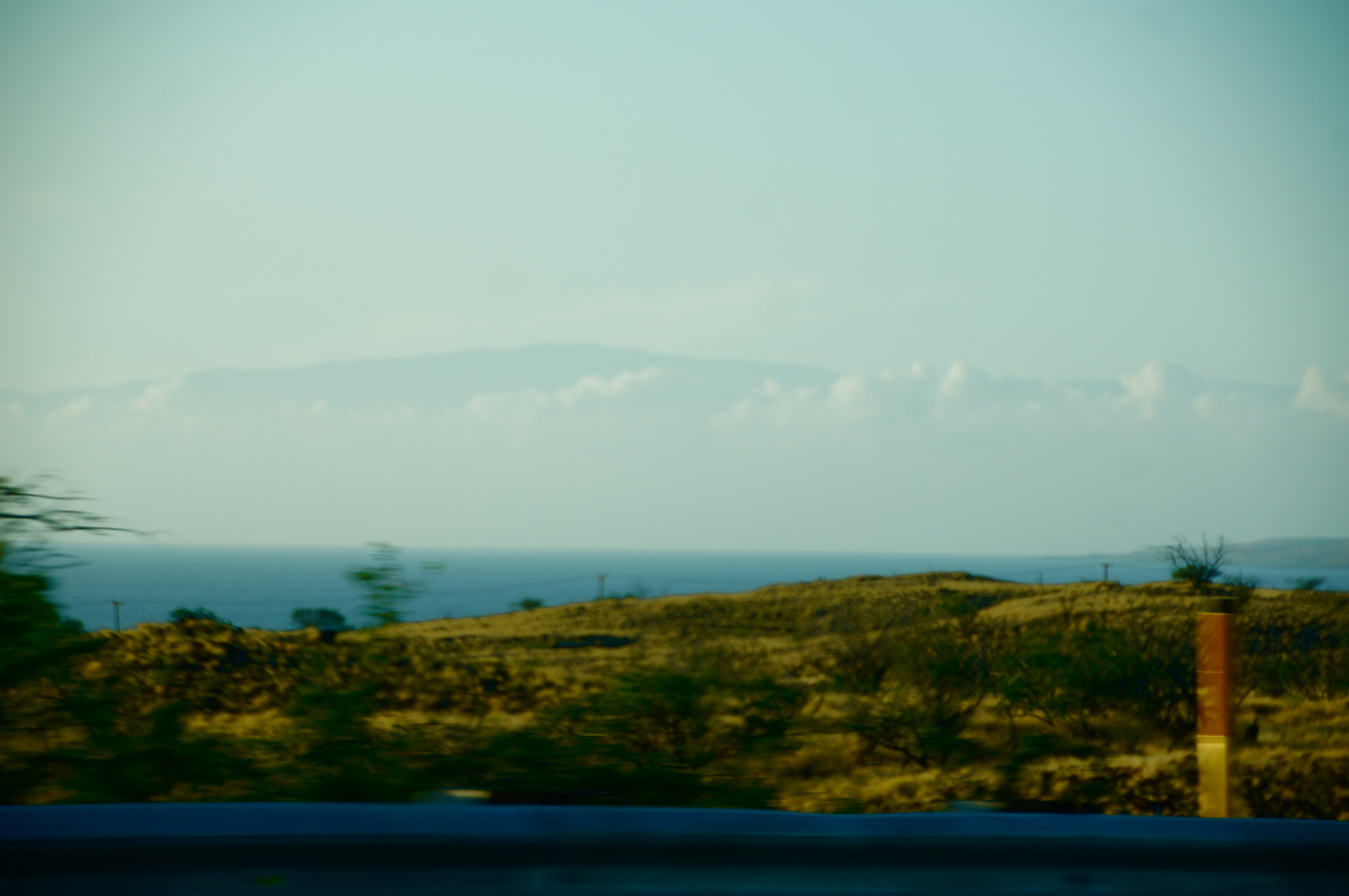
Haleakalā as seen looking northwest from Big Island, Hawaii, near Kawaihae, 85 kilometers (53 mi) away

=== Volcanic hazard ===
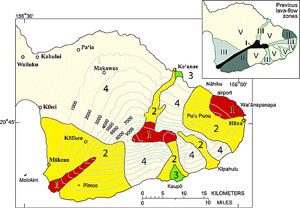
Lava Flow Hazard map of Haleakalā. The Maui Hazard Zone numbers are two less than the equivalent Hawaiʻi Hazard Zone numbers.

On the island of Hawaiʻi, lava-flow hazards are rated on a scale of one through nine with one being the zone of highest hazard and nine being the zone of lowest hazard. For example, the summits and rift zones of Kilauea and Mauna Loa volcanoes are rated Hazard Zone 1.

Using this same scale, preliminary estimates of lava-flow hazard zones on Maui made in 1983 by the U.S. Geological Survey rated the summit and southwest rift zone of Haleakalā as Hazard Zone 3. The steep, downslope areas of the Kanaio and Kahikinui ahupuaʻa and the area north of Hana are rated as Hazard Zone 4. Other areas of Haleakalā are rated comparable to the lava-flow hazards of Mauna Kea and Kohala (Hazard Zones 7 through 9).

These high hazard estimates for Haleakalā are based on the frequency of its eruptions. Haleakalā has erupted three times in approximately the last 900 years. By way of comparison, both Mauna Loa and Kilauea have erupted more than a dozen times each in the last 90 years. Hualalai has an eruption rate comparable to Haleakalā. All of Hualalai is rated as Hazard Zone 4. However, the frequency of eruption of a volcano is only one of the criteria on which hazards are based. The other important criterion is the lava flow coverage rate. Using the preliminary dates for Haleakalā flows, only 8.7 square miles (23 km^{2}) of lava flows have been emplaced in the last 900 years. In comparison, approximately 43 square miles (110 km^{2}) of Hualalai are covered with flows 900 years old or younger and approximately 104 square miles (270 km^{2}) on Kilauea and 85 square miles (220 km^{2}) on Mauna Loa are covered by lavas less than 200 years old. Thus, Haleakalā is a distant fourth in coverage rates.

According to the United States Geological Survey Volcano Warning Scheme for the United States, the Volcano Alert Level for Haleakalā as of 3 June 2021 was "normal". A "Normal" status is used to designate typical volcanic activity in a background, non-eruptive phase.

== Endangered species ==
=== Nēnē ===
The nēnē bird is on the endangered species list. The bird was once on all the islands of Hawaii, but now it is only on the Island of Hawai’i, Maui, Moloka’i, and Kaua’i. Habitat loss, hunting, and the introduction of mammals caused the bird population to dwindle. Since 2010, only 2,000 birds were left. These birds were then kept in captivity to increase the population.

=== Silversword ===
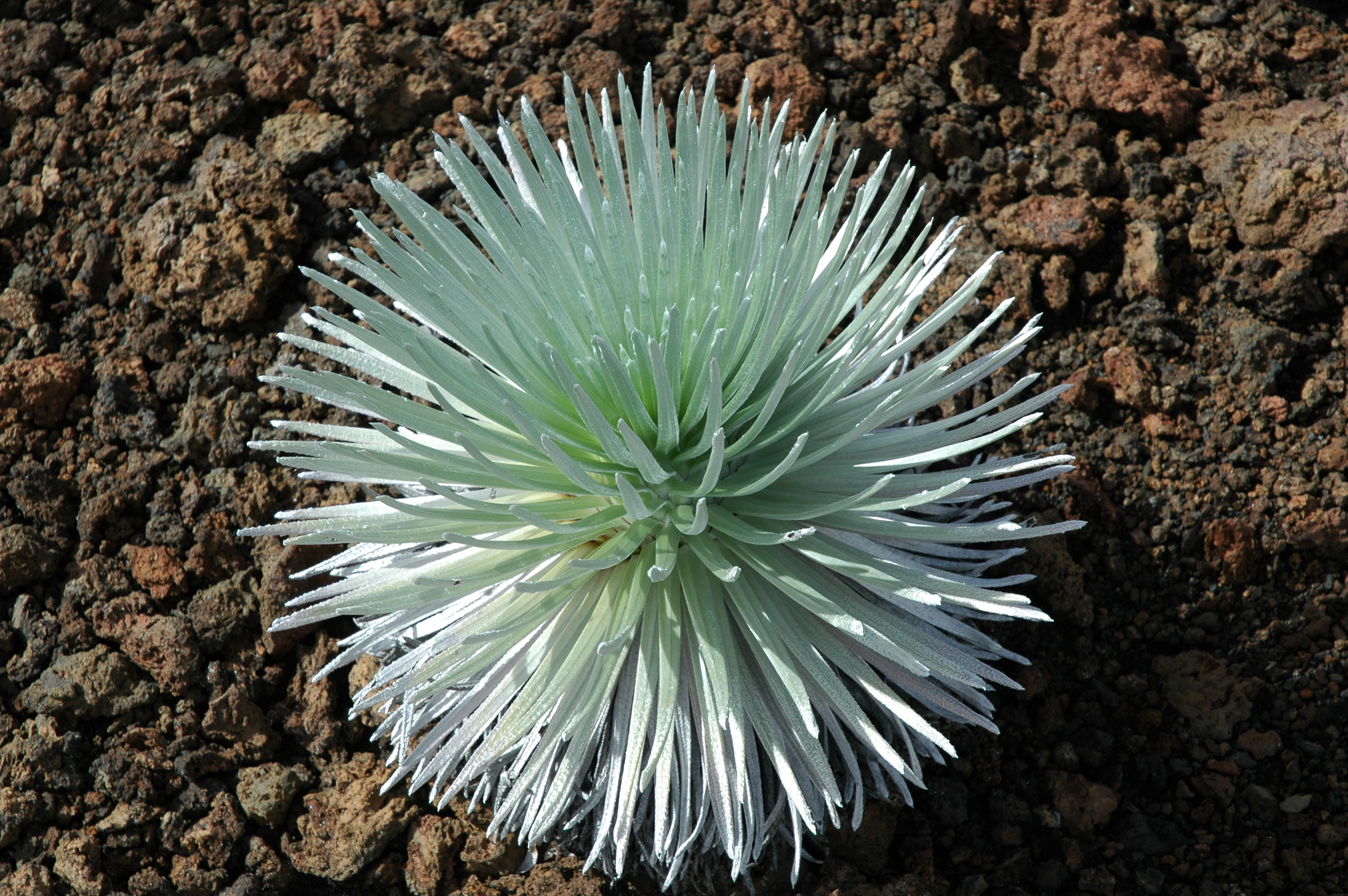
This rare species of Silversword is fragile and lives only upon the slopes of Haleakalā.

Haleakalā silversword is a quintessential plant of Haleakalā since it grows nowhere else on Earth. Climate change has been threatening the population of this plant due to hotter temperatures and lower rainfall. The park service has erected fences to prevent damage from local herbivores and from visitors taking the plants as souvenirs.

=== Forest birds ===
Several species of native forest birds across Hawaiʻi are nearly extinct, including the kiwikiu and 'ākohekohe that are found only in East Maui, whose population decreased by more than 70% in the 21st century. A primary threat is mosquito-borne diseases such as avian malaria. Attempts to relocate kiwikiu to higher elevations were unsuccessful in protecting the population, as mosquitos also rose into higher elevation habitats after the 1980s.

The working group "Birds, Not Mosquitos" joined with the National Park Service and the Hawaii Department of Land and Natural Resources to develop a plan to address the threat, eventually settling on the incompatible insect technique. As of 2024, each week some 250,000 male southern house mosquitos carrying Wolbachia bacteria were released on the mountain, totaling 10 million by June of that year. When male mosquitos with Wolbachia mate with female mosquitoes, their resulting eggs do not hatch.

=== Invertebrates ===
Haleakalā is also home to many invertebrates including snails, spiders, moths, flies, and many more. Many species including snails live in the rainforest around the mountain. While others live in the subalpine shrubland and the rocky alpine terrain. The Haleakalā flightless moth is endemic to the alpine area at the summit. Many snails including those in the genus Partulina live in the Rainforest. Yellow faced bees known as Nalo Meli Maoli in Hawaiian live in most of the mountain's habitats.

== Modern uses ==
=== National Park ===
Surrounding and including the crater is Haleakalā National Park, a 30,183-acre (122.15 km^{2}) park, of which 24,719 acres (100.03 km^{2}) are wilderness. The park includes the summit depression, Kipahulu Valley on the southeast, and ʻOheʻo Gulch (and pools), extending to the shoreline in the Kipahulu area. From the summit, there are two main trails leading into Haleakalā: Sliding Sands Trail and Halemauʻu Trail.

The temperature near the summit tends to vary between about 40 and 60 °F (4 and 16 °C) and, especially given the thin air and the possibility of dehydration at that elevation, the walking trails can be more challenging than one might expect. This is aggravated by the fact that trails lead downhill from parking areas into the crater. Because of this, hikers are faced with a difficult return ascent after potentially descending 2000 ft or more to the crater floor. Despite this, Haleakalā is popular with tourists and locals alike, who often venture to its summit, or to the visitor center just below the summit, to view the sunrise. There is lodging in the form of a few simple cabins, though no food or gas is available in the park. To help with preservation efforts, Haleakalā National Park started requiring a sunrise reservation to enter Haleakala National Park between the hours of 3:00 AM and 7:00 AM HST.

=== Astrophysical research ===
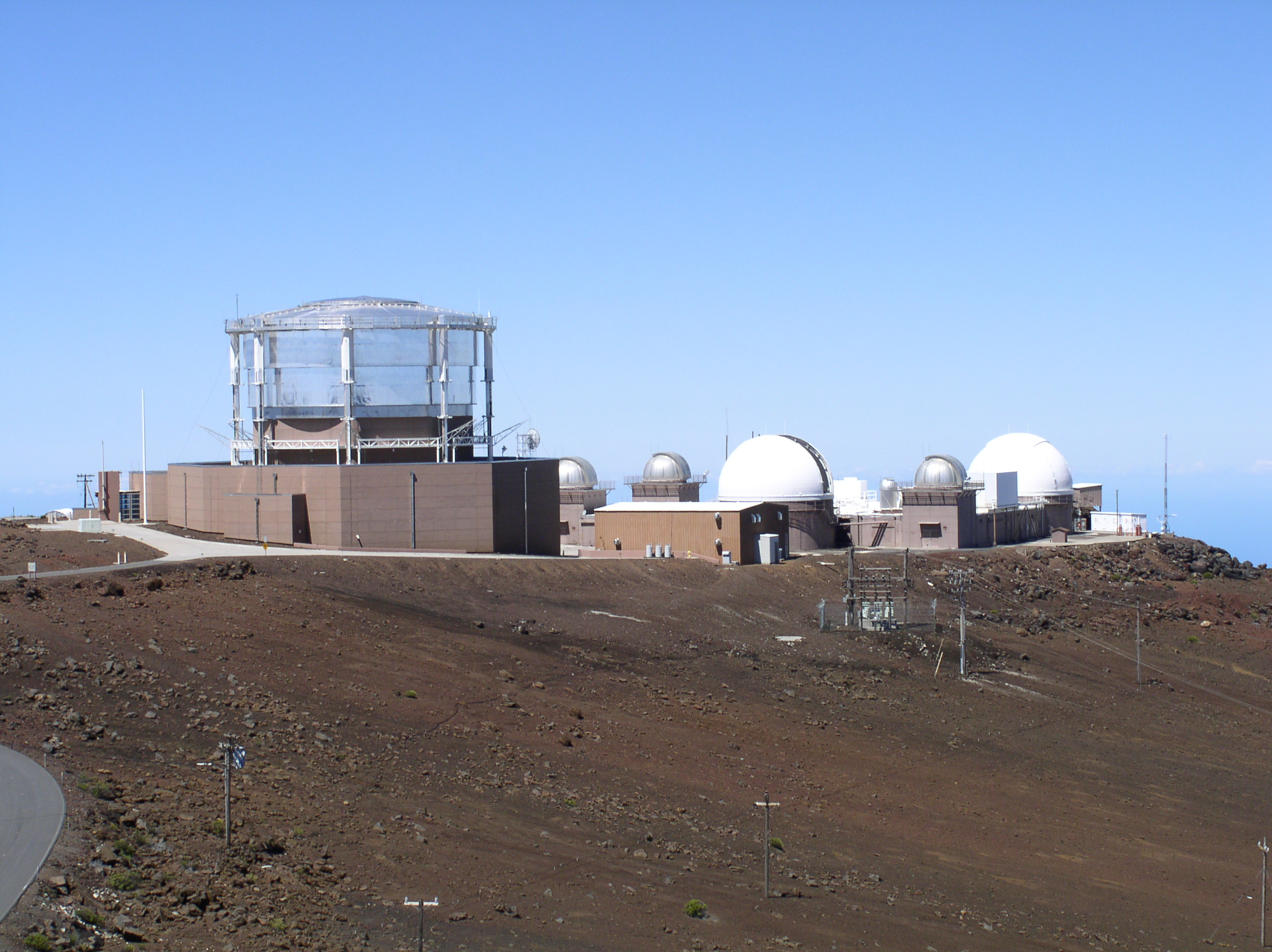
The Space Surveillance Systems

Because of the remarkable clarity, dryness, and stillness of the air, and its elevation (with atmospheric pressure of 71 kilopascals (530 mmHg)), as well as the absence of the lights of major cities, the summit of Haleakalā is one of the most sought-after locations in the world for ground-based telescopes (though to a lesser extent than Mauna Kea on neighboring Hawaii). As a result of the geographic importance of this observational platform, experts come from all over the world to take part in research at "Science City", an astrophysical complex operated by the U.S. Department of Defense, University of Hawaiʻi, Smithsonian Institution, Air Force, Federal Aviation Administration, and others.

Some of the telescopes operated by the US Department of Defense are involved in researching man-made (e.g. spacecraft, monitoring satellites, rockets, and laser technology) rather than celestial objects. The program is in collaboration with defense contractors in the Maui Research and Technology Park in Kihei. The astronomers on Haleakalā are concerned about increasing light pollution as Maui's population grows. Nevertheless, new telescopes are added, such as the Pan-STARRS in 2006.

=== Transportation ===
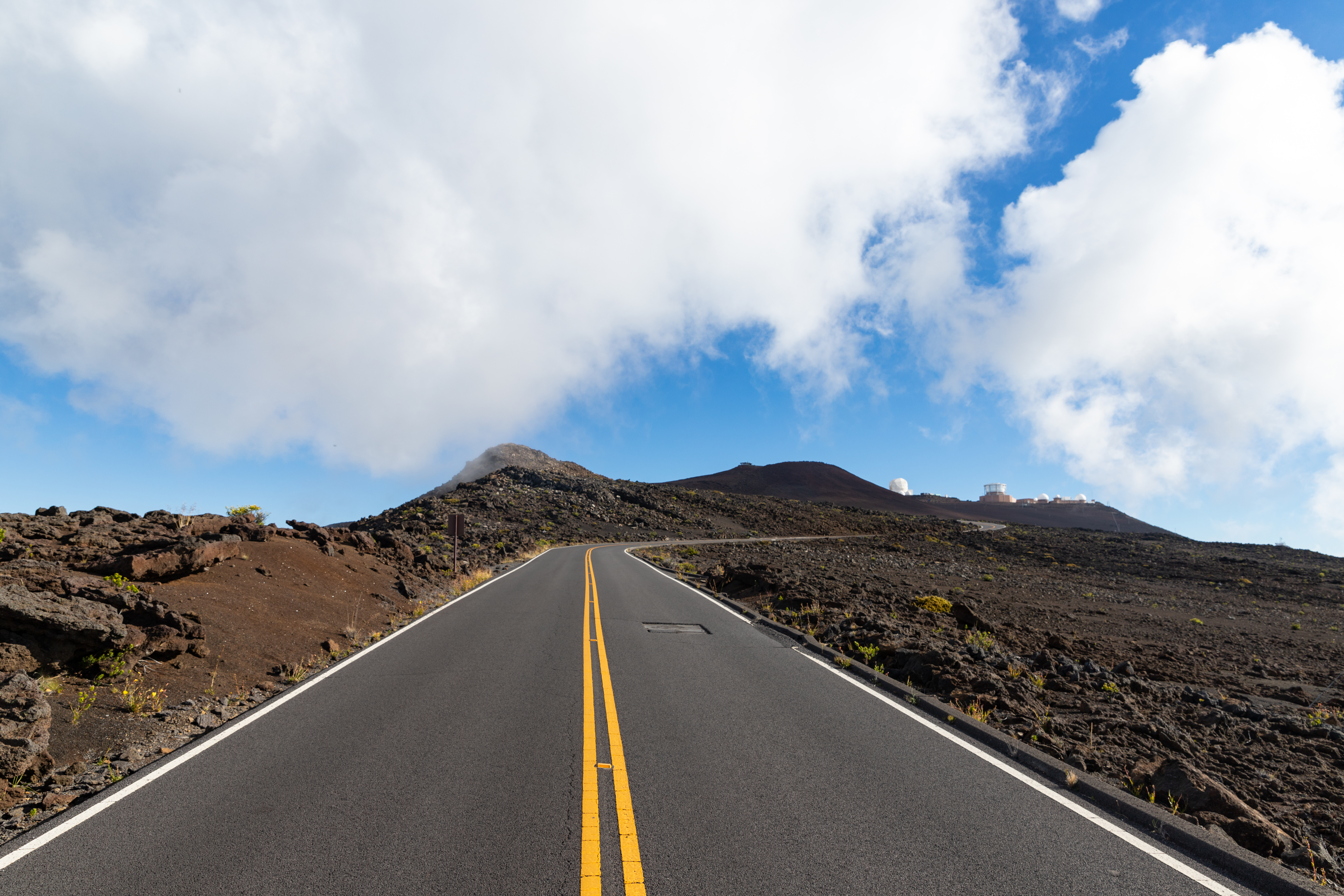
Public road to summit of Haleakalā, Maui, Hawaii

A well traveled Haleakalā Highway, completed in 1935, is a road mainly composed of switchbacks that leads to the peak of Haleakalā. The road is open to the public (although parts of it are restricted) and is a well-maintained two-lane highway containing many blind turns. Local animals, including cattle, are often encountered in the roadway. The Park Service charges a vehicle entrance fee of $30 (US). Public transportation does not go through the park, but there are four vehicle based tour companies (Polynesian Adventure Tours, Skyline Eco Adventures, Haleakalā EcoTours, and Valley Isle Excursions) that operate tours of the park and trips to the summit.

There are three Sunset and Stargazing tours permitted within Haleakalā National Park. Arrive for sunset and stay to look through a telescope after dark. Cycling and horseback riding are other popular ways to explore the park. There are a few tour guides on Maui that pick people up at their hotels, and outfit them with a bicycle to glide down the road from just outside the National Park boundary (starting at 6500 ft altitude). Tour operators used to run bike rides down the entire 27 miles from the summit, but in 2007 the National Park Service suspended all commercial bicycle activity within the park boundaries, following multiple fatal accidents. Some tour operators now offer a modified version of the service which descends 6,500 feet from outside of the National Park.

== Climate ==
Haleakalā's summit experiences a cold-summer Mediterranean climate (Köppen classification Csc), one of the few locations in the world with this climate type. The Haleakalā Ranger station, at a lower elevation, lies in the subtropical highland (Cfb, bordering on Csb if the 40 millimetres (1.6 in) threshold is used) climate zone. It is in hardiness zone 10a.

Climate data for Haleakalā Ranger Station 6,962 ft (2,122 m) asl. (1991–2020 normals, extremes 1940–present)
Month	Jan	Feb	Mar	Apr	May	Jun	Jul	Aug	Sep	Oct	Nov	Dec	Year
Record high °F (°C)	78 (26)	76 (24)	78 (26)	79 (26)	78 (26)	78 (26)	80 (27)	78 (26)	78 (26)	80 (27)	76 (24)	74 (23)	80 (27)
Mean maximum °F (°C)	68.6 (20.3)	67.5 (19.7)	67.2 (19.6)	67.8 (19.9)	70.3 (21.3)	72.2 (22.3)	72.6 (22.6)	73.0 (22.8)	70.1 (21.2)	70.4 (21.3)	69.7 (20.9)	69.4 (20.8)	74.6 (23.7)
Mean daily maximum °F (°C)	61.0 (16.1)	59.7 (15.4)	59.7 (15.4)	60.7 (15.9)	63.2 (17.3)	65.6 (18.7)	65.5 (18.6)	66.1 (18.9)	64.7 (18.2)	64.0 (17.8)	63.1 (17.3)	61.1 (16.2)	62.9 (17.2)
Daily mean °F (°C)	52.5 (11.4)	51.2 (10.7)	51.4 (10.8)	52.2 (11.2)	54.6 (12.6)	56.6 (13.7)	57.2 (14.0)	57.7 (14.3)	56.3 (13.5)	55.9 (13.3)	55.0 (12.8)	53.1 (11.7)	54.5 (12.5)
Mean daily minimum °F (°C)	43.9 (6.6)	42.7 (5.9)	43.1 (6.2)	43.8 (6.6)	45.9 (7.7)	47.7 (8.7)	48.9 (9.4)	49.4 (9.7)	47.9 (8.8)	47.8 (8.8)	47.0 (8.3)	45.1 (7.3)	46.1 (7.8)
Mean minimum °F (°C)	37.3 (2.9)	36.5 (2.5)	36.7 (2.6)	38.5 (3.6)	40.0 (4.4)	42.2 (5.7)	42.8 (6.0)	43.2 (6.2)	42.7 (5.9)	42.6 (5.9)	41.0 (5.0)	39.1 (3.9)	34.4 (1.3)
Record low °F (°C)	29 (−2)	27 (−3)	30 (−1)	31 (−1)	32 (0)	33 (1)	32 (0)	33 (1)	35 (2)	31 (−1)	29 (−2)	30 (−1)	27 (−3)
Average precipitation inches (mm)	5.14 (131)	4.08 (104)	5.70 (145)	2.75 (70)	2.44 (62)	1.62 (41)	2.70 (69)	2.17 (55)	2.53 (64)	3.25 (83)	4.59 (117)	5.28 (134)	42.25 (1,073)
Average precipitation days (≥ 0.01 in)	9.3	8.8	12.9	12.1	9.3	8.6	10.7	10.7	12.1	11.5	12.3	11.8	130.1
Source: NOAA

Climate data for Haleakalā Summit 338 (1971–2000 normals)
Month	Jan	Feb	Mar	Apr	May	Jun	Jul	Aug	Sep	Oct	Nov	Dec	Year
Record high °F (°C)	69 (21)	69 (21)	67 (19)	68 (20)	70 (21)	73 (23)	66 (19)	70 (21)	68 (20)	68 (20)	65 (18)	69 (21)	73 (23)
Mean daily maximum °F (°C)	45.2 (7.3)	49.9 (9.9)	50.9 (10.5)	52.2 (11.2)	54.7 (12.6)	58.3 (14.6)	57.7 (14.3)	58.5 (14.7)	57.6 (14.2)	56.8 (13.8)	50.5 (10.3)	42.8 (6.0)	53.1 (11.7)
Mean daily minimum °F (°C)	33.6 (0.9)	36.1 (2.3)	36.5 (2.5)	37.4 (3.0)	39.1 (3.9)	42.1 (5.6)	41.8 (5.4)	42.3 (5.7)	42.1 (5.6)	41.3 (5.2)	37.6 (3.1)	31.8 (−0.1)	38.6 (3.7)
Record low °F (°C)	20 (−7)	15 (−9)	20 (−7)	21 (−6)	31 (−1)	30 (−1)	28 (−2)	30 (−1)	25 (−4)	26 (−3)	29 (−2)	22 (−6)	15 (−9)
Average precipitation inches (mm)	8.00 (203)	3.57 (91)	3.05 (77)	4.00 (102)	1.35 (34)	0.37 (9.4)	0.47 (12)	1.11 (28)	1.59 (40)	1.32 (34)	4.09 (104)	4.67 (119)	33.59 (853)
Average snowfall inches (cm)	0.0 (0.0)	0.2 (0.51)	0.0 (0.0)	0.0 (0.0)	0.0 (0.0)	0.0 (0.0)	0.0 (0.0)	0.0 (0.0)	0.0 (0.0)	0.0 (0.0)	0.0 (0.0)	0.0 (0.0)	0.2 (0.51)
Source: Western Regional Climate Center

== See also ==
- List of mountain peaks of the United States
  - List of volcanoes of the United States
    - List of mountain peaks of Hawaii
- List of Ultras of Oceania
- List of Ultras of the United States
- Hawaii hotspot
- Evolution of Hawaiian volcanoes
- Hawaiian–Emperor seamount chain
- Haleakalā Wilderness
