= EarthScope Consortium =

Geophysical science support organization

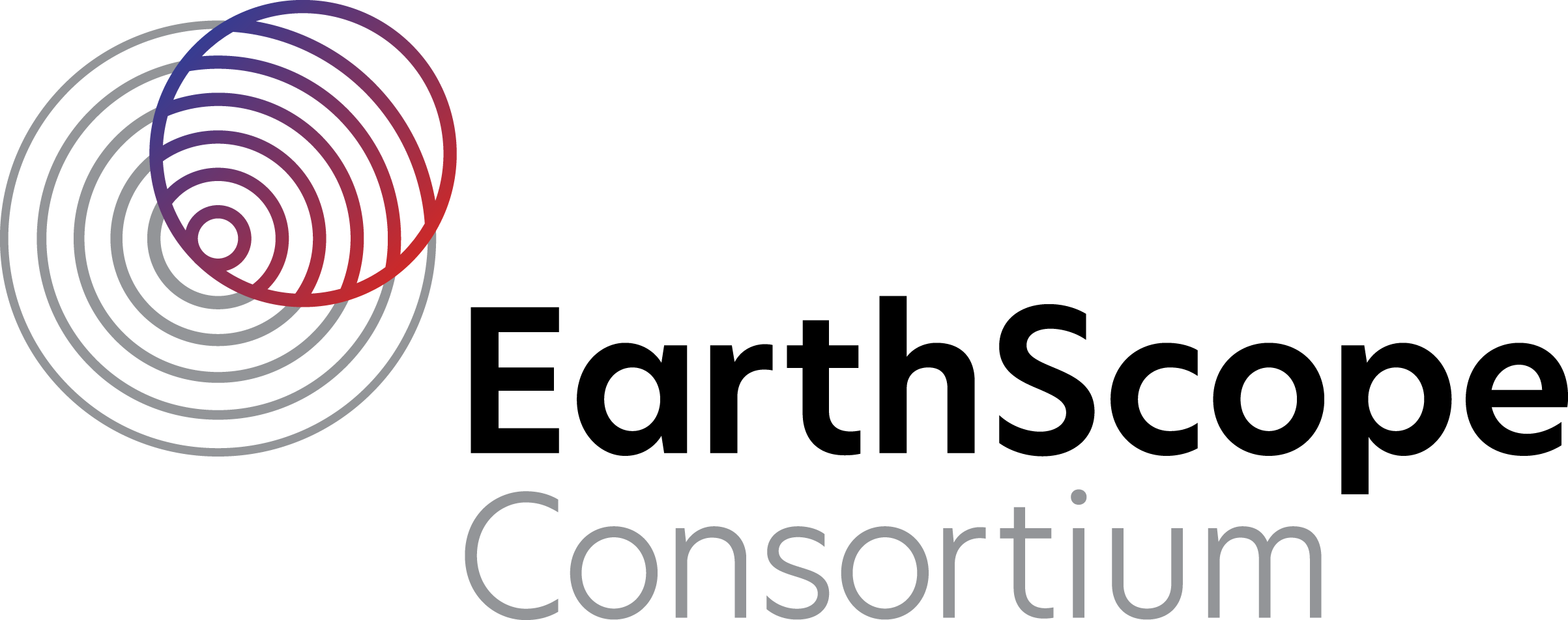
- Founded: January 1, 2023
- Headquarters: Washington, D.C.
- Services: Research, Education
- Website: www.earthscope.org

EarthScope Consortium is a 501(c)(3) nonprofit geophysical science support organization. EarthScope Consortium operates two of the National Science Foundation's (NSF) major research facilities, the NSF Geodetic Facility for the Advancement of Geoscience (NSF GAGE) and the NSF Seismological Facility for the Advancement of Geoscience (NSF SAGE), which provide geophysical instrumentation, data access, and services to support geoscience research and education.

EarthScope Consortium's corporate headquarters are located in Washington, D.C., and an instrument facility is located in Socorro, New Mexico.

== Background ==
EarthScope Consortium was formed on January 1, 2023 through the merger of the Incorporated Research Institutions for Seismology (IRIS) and UNAVCO. Both founded in 1984, IRIS and UNAVCO supported the U.S. scientific community's access to data, instrumentation, and educational resources within seismology and geodesy, respectively.

The "EarthScope Consortium" name is connected to IRIS and UNAVCO's previous collaboration in the 2003–2018 NSF-funded EarthScope Program, which included operation of the USArray and Plate Boundary Observatory components.

== EarthScope Primary Instrument Center ==
The EarthScope Primary Instrument Center (EPIC) (formerly known as the IRIS PASSCAL Instrument Center) is located in Socorro, New Mexico at the New Mexico Institute of Mining and Technology and houses central instrumentation maintenance and engineering activities.

The EarthScope Primary Instrument Center (EPIC, formerly the IRIS PASSCAL Instrument Center) at the New Mexico Tech campus.

EPIC supports geophysical network operations in global and regional scientific networks, including:

- The Network of the Americas (NOTA)
- Global Seismographic Network (GSN)
- Global GNSS Network (GGN)
- Borehole Strainmeter Network (BSM)
- The Polar Network Operations funded by the NSF Office of Polar Programs (OPP)

== NSF GAGE Facility ==
EarthScope Consortium is the operator of the NSF's Geodetic Facility for the Advancement of Geoscience (GAGE), previously operated by UNAVCO since the facility's creation in 2013. The NSF GAGE Facility funding is designated to support:

- The Network of the Americas (NOTA), an international geophysics sensor network of more than 1,200 continuously operating instruments. These instruments include geodetic GPS/GNSS stations and borehole strain, seismic, and tilt instruments. NOTA integrates stations from pre-existing GPS networks, including the Plate Boundary Observatory (which spans a range including Alaska, Continental U.S., and Puerto Rico), TLALOCNet (Mexico), and COCONet (Caribbean and the neighboring area). Data from this network are used for various fields of Earth science research, hazard monitoring (including the Yellowstone Volcano Observatory), and precision positioning applications like surveying or agriculture.
- Stations in the NASA Global GNSS Network (GGN), which contributes to the International GNSS Service (IGS) responsible for the International Terrestrial Reference Frame.
- Instrumentation and data access for geodesy research driven by Principal Investigators.
- Maintenance of some United States Geological Survey (USGS) Volcano Hazards Program GPS/GNSS stations.
- Data operations for the GPS/GNSS component of the ShakeAlert earthquake early warning system.
- Education, workforce development, and outreach related to geodesy and geoscience.

== NSF SAGE Facility ==
EarthScope Consortium is the operator of the NSF's Seismological Facility for the Advancement of Geoscience (SAGE), previously operated by IRIS since the facility's creation in 2013. The NSF SAGE Facility funding is designated to support:

- Operation of the Global Seismographic Network (GSN) (jointly with the USGS). The GSN is a globally distributed seismic network of over 150 stations. The NSF SAGE Facility provides for maintenance of approximately one third of the GSN stations. The USGS, via the Albuquerque Seismological Laboratory, operates the remainder of GSN stations. Data from this network are used for earthquake detection and research, imaging of the Earth's interior, and contribute to the Comprehensive Nuclear-Test-Ban Treaty Organization's (CTBTO) International Monitoring System.
- Archiving and distribution of seismological and other geophysical research data and data products.
- Maintenance and deployment of seismic, magnetotelluric, and other portable instrumentation for Principal Investigator-led research projects.
- Education, workforce development, and outreach related to seismology and geoscience.

== See also ==
- Seismology
- Geodesy
- Geophysics
- IRIS Consortium
- UNAVCO
- EarthScope
