= EarthScope Primary Instrument Center =

EarthScope Primary Instrument Center (EPIC) located on the New Mexico Tech Campus.

The EarthScope Primary Instrument Center (EPIC, formerly the PASSCAL Instrument Center) is a research center at New Mexico Institute of Mining and Technology for geophysics research in Earth system science. The facility provides instrumentation and support services for seismology experiments around the world, as well as those for the National Science Foundation and the U.S. Department of Energy.

It supports the research of the Geodetic Facility for the Advancement of Geoscience (GAGE) and the Seismological Facility for the Advancement of Geoscience (SAGE), two National Science Foundation (NSF) organizations.

It was originally the Program for Array Seismic Studies of the Continental Lithosphere (PASSCAL) instrument center, an IRIS (Incorporated Research Institutions for Seismology) facility program dedicated to seismographic data collection associated with research deployments using highly portable seismology instrumentation.

== History ==
EPIC was formerly the IRIS Program for Array Seismic Studies of the Continental Lithosphere (PASSCAL) Instrument Center.

PASSCAL was first created in 1984. In 1998, two instrument centers, the Stanford and the Lamont instrument centers, were combined to form the PASSCAL Instrument Center at New Mexico Tech. Starting in 2005, the following facilities were added to PASSCAL from what was then EarthScope (2003–2018), a preceding organization to Earthscope Primary Instrument Center (EPIC):

- EarthScope Array Operations Facility
- EarthScope Flexible Array

In 2006, a polar support group provided instrumentation and support for portable seismic experiments to projects in the polar regions.

Examples are of polar projects that PASSCAL had assisted on are the following:

- Greenland Ice Sheet Monitoring Network (GLISN)
- Geophysical Earth Observatory for Ice Covered Environments (GEOICE)

Later, IRIS (Incorporated Research Institutions for Seismology) merged with UNAVCO (University Navstar Consortium) on January 1, 2023, to form Earthscope Consortium, 20 years after the separate organization of Earthscope (2003–2018) had been created.

From that event, IRIS PASSCAL became the Earthscope Primary Instrument Center (EPIC).

Prior to the merger, the management of the following National Science Foundation (NSF) organizations was as follows:

- UNAVCO supported the Geodetic Facility for the Advancement of Geoscience (GAGE)
- IRIS PASSCAL supported the Seismological Facility for the Advancement of Geoscience (SAGE)

Post merger, EPIC supports both GAGE and SAGE as its primary mission.

== Instrumentation ==
EPIC provides the following types of seismology instrumentation for research all over the world:

- High Resolution Data Acquisition Systems
- Short Period Sensors
- High Frequency Sensors
- Broadband Sensors

== Geophysical network support ==
EPIC supports the following global and regional scientific networks:

- Network of the Americas (NOTA)
- Global Seismographic Network (GSN)
- Global GNSS Network (GGN)
- Borehole strainmeter network (BSM)
- Polar network operations funded by the NSF Office of Polar Programs (OPP)

== Environmental Applications ==
The United States Geological Survey (USGS) as well as Earthscope through EPIC helped monitor salt mines for hydrogen storage as an alternative energy fuel.
