= Geodetic Facility for the Advancement of Geoscience =

American geophysical facility for geoscience research and education

The U.S. National Science Foundation's Geodetic Facility for the Advancement of Geoscience (NSF GAGE) is a geophysical facility for geoscience research and education. It focuses on research of Earth's surface deformation with enhanced temporal and spatial resolution—the field of geodesy. GAGE is one of the two premier geophysical facilities in support of geoscience and geoscience education of the National Science Foundation. The other geophysical facility is the Seismological Facility for the Advancement of Geoscience (NSF SAGE).

It operates and maintains the Network of the Americas (NOTA), supports researchers with access to instrumentation (including polar research projects such as POLENET), archives data, and provides education and workforce development resources. It is operated by EarthScope Consortium. The previous operator was UNAVCO, until its merger with the Incorporated Research Institutions for Seismology (IRIS) to become EarthScope Consortium.

== Network of the Americas (NOTA) ==
GPS sensor, a component of the Plate Boundary Observatory (PBO)

The Network of the Americas (NOTA) is an international network of geophysical sensors. The network spans more than 20 countries, stretching from the Aleutian Islands to the Caribbean. It is composed of more than 1,200 continuously operating instruments, which include:

- High-precision GNSS (Global Navigation Satellite System) stations
- Borehole strainmeter, seismometer, and tiltmeter instruments

The network is used to measure ground motion related to tectonic plates, earthquakes, volcanoes, groundwater change, and other solid Earth processes, in addition to atmospheric measurements of water vapor and total electron content in the ionosphere.

It was created by combining the following networks:

- The Plate Boundary Observatory (PBO), which spans Alaska, the continental US, and Puerto Rico.
- TLALOCNet, which consists of 40 stations in Mexico.
- COCONet, which consists of 85 stations spanning the Caribbean.

== NASA Global GNSS Network ==
NSF GAGE provides support for the NASA Global GNSS Network that forms part of the International GNSS Service (IGS) network. The IGS network is used to produce the International Terrestrial Reference Frame (ITRF) for positioning, satellite navigation and Earth science applications.
