= Anne Meltzer =

Seismologist

Anne S. Meltzer
- Education: Guilford College (B.S. 1980), University of North Carolina, Chapel Hill (M.S. 1982), Rice University(Ph.D. 1988)
- Scientific career
- Workplaces: Gulf Research and Development Company(1982-1985), Exxon Production Research (1989-1990), Lehigh university(1990-present)
- Thesis: Crustal structure and tectonic evolution: Central California (1989)

Anne Meltzer is a seismologist known for her research on earthquakes and the formation of mountain ranges. Her research primarily focused on the evolution of the Earth's lithosphere and the surface processes associated with faulting and deformation in the Earth's crust. Through her own personal research and collaboration with other colleagues, she strived to make advancements in the efficiency and effectiveness of monitoring earthquakes. In addition, her work aimed to effectively reduce earthquake destruction in countries that experience frequent seismic phenomena.

== Education and career ==
A photograph of an Earthscope Short Drill Brace Monument GPS Geosensor.

Meltzer has a B.S. in geology from Guilford College (1980), an M.S. in geology from University of North Carolina, Chapel Hill (1982), and Ph.D. in geology and geophysics from Rice University (1989). She has worked in industry at Gulf Research and Development Company (1982–1985) and at Exxon Production Research (1989–1990). In 1990 she moved to Lehigh University where she was promoted to professor in 2001. Then in 2002-2004 Meltzer was chaired in the Department of Earth and Environmental Sciences. From 2004 to 2011, she was the Dean of the College of Arts and Sciences at Lehigh University. In 2014 she was named the Francis J. Trembley Chair in Earth and Environmental Sciences. Meltzer made contributions to the concept creation of the USArray(an array of transportable seismic stations). Her leadership in her field led to the interest and contribution on the National Science Foundation-EarthScope facility and science program. She had a big part in the crafting play for the EarthScope Facility. In May 2015, Meltzer was a key individual in the on-goings of said workshop, which gathered 100 researchers in sharing the best modern practices of geophysical networks. This led to deployment of an IRIS seismometer in 2016, which was used to record the aftershocks of an earthquake in Ecuador.

== Research ==
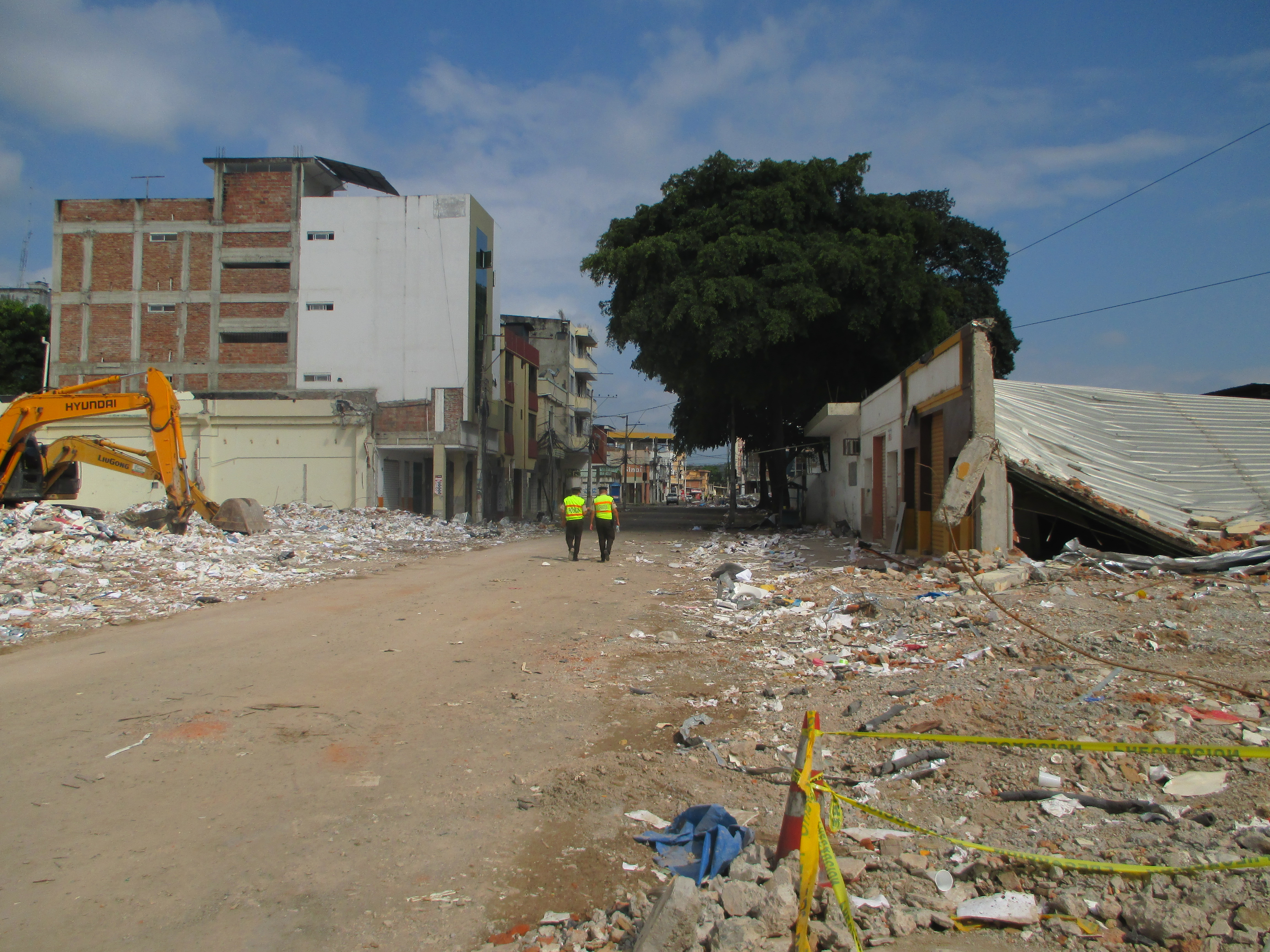
Devastation in Portoviejo, Ecuador after a 7.8 magnitude earthquake.

The focus of Meltzer's research is the dynamic change that occurs in the continental lithosphere. She conducts her research by analyzing the processes of faulting and deformation in the Earth's crust. Meltzer's research uses seismographic data to examine the formation of new mountain ranges including the Tibetan Plateau and Nanga Parbat in Pakistan. She has examined earthquake faults in Mongolia and characterized the aftershocks of the April 2016 Ecuador earthquake. Off the coast of California, Meltzer has also examined deformation of the oceanic plates in the Santa Maria Basin. Meltzer observes earthquakes to extrapolate data to conclude the source mechanisms of an earthquake. Another critical focus of Meltzer's work is studying how to use new and developing seismic instrumentation to decrease earthquake injuries and death.

=== Selected publications ===
- Hoskins, M., Meltzer, A. Font, Y., Agurto-Detzel, H., Vaca, S., Rolandone, F., Nocquet, J.M., Soto-Cordero, L., Stachnik, J., Beck, S., Lynner, C., Ruiz, M., Alvarado, A., Hernandez, S., Charvis, P., Regnier, M., Leon-Rios, S., Rietbrock, A. , Earth and Planetary Science Letters. Triggered crustal earthquake swarm across subduction segment boundary after the 2016 Pedernales, Ecuador megathrust earthquake
- Li, Chang; van der Hilst, Robert D.; Meltzer, Anne S.; Engdahl, E. Robert (September 2008). "Subduction of the Indian lithosphere beneath the Tibetan Plateau and Burma". Earth and Planetary Science Letters. 274 (1–2): 157–168. Bibcode:2008E&PSL.274..157L. doi:10.1016/j.epsl.2008.07.016.
- Lynner, C., Koch, C., Beck, S., Meltzer, A., Soto-Cordero, L., Hoskins, M., Stachnik, J., Ruiz, M., Alvarado, A., Charvis, P., Font, Y., Regnier, M., Agurto-Detzel, H., Rietbrock, A., Porritt, R.(2020) Upper-plate structure in Ecuador coincident with the subduction of the Carnegie Ridge and the southern extent of large mega-thrust earthquakes
- Meltzer, Anne; Christensen, Nikolas (1 February 1992). "Dislocation creep regimes in quartz aggregates". Journal of Structural Geology. 14 (2): 145–159. Bibcode:1992JSG....14..145H. doi:10.1016/0191-8141(92)90053-Y.
- Meltzer, Anne; Sarker, Golam; Beaudoin, Bruce; Seeber, Leonardo; Armbruster, John (2001-07-01). "Seismic characterization of an active metamorphic massif, Nanga Parbat, Pakistan Himalaya". Geology. 29 (7): 651–654. Bibcode:2001Geo....29..651M. doi:10.1130/0091-7613(2001)029<0651:SCOAAM>2.0.CO;2. ISSN 0091-7613.
- Meltzer, Anne, Josh Stachnik, Demberel Sodnomsambuu, Ulziibat Munkhuu, Baasanbat Tsagaan, Mungunsren Dashdondog, and Raymond Russo (2019)The Central Mongolia Seismic Experiment: Multiple Applications of Temporary Broadband Seismic Arrays, Seismological Research Letters
- Sirait, A., Meltzer, A., Waldhauser, F., Stachnik, J., Daryono, D., Fatchurochman, I., Jatnika, J., Sembiring, A., 2020. Bull. Seismol. Soc. Am. .Analysis of the Mw 6.5 December 15, 2017 and the Mw 5.9 January 23, 2018 Java Earthquakes https://doi.org/10.1785/0120200046

== Awards and honors ==
- Fellow, American Geophysical Union (2016)
- Ambassador Award, American Geophysical Union (2016)
- Hillman Award for Excellence in Graduate Advising (2018)
