= Paul Silver =

American seismologist (1948–2009)

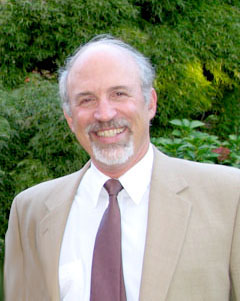
Paul Silver

Paul Gordon Silver (November 30, 1948 – August 7, 2009) was an American seismologist. A member of the research staff at the Department of Terrestrial Magnetism of the Carnegie Institution of Washington since 1982, Paul Silver made a series of important contributions to the investigation of seismic anisotropy and to earthquake research by observing the slow redistribution of stress and strain along fault zones.

Paul Silver and his younger daughter Celine died in an automobile accident in North Carolina on August 7, 2009.

== Contributions to Geosciences ==
One of Silver's principal research interests was seismic anisotropy and its implications for the tectonic evolution of the Earth. He organized and conducted seismic field experiments in northern Canada, southern Africa, Chile and Bolivia, China, and Tibet, as well in California and elsewhere in western North America. Silver and colleagues were the first to conduct, in 1989, a modern portable broadband seismic experiment. This experiment was designed to explore the deep structure of the North American continent, but also formed the starting point for the development of novel methods of seismological investigation: with Winston Chan, Martha Savage, and other colleagues, Silver elaborated on earlier work and deduced from the measurements the splitting of shear waves, a type of seismic anisotropy, for areas of the size of tectonic plates in order to determine the patterns of convection in the upper mantle and the deformation history of the continental and subcontinental lithosphere that record how the continent grew and evolved. This approach has been developed ever since and is now in widespread use to study the patterns of convective flow in the Earth’s interior and the processes by which the continents were assembled. His shear-wave splitting studies with Mark Behn and Clint Conrad showed that the pattern of seismic anisotropy under oceanic lithosphere can be explained as being caused by mantle flow driven by plate motions and mantle density heterogeneity. With Behn, he also made the controversial proposition that plate tectonics on Earth is intermittent and may have been temporarily interrupted in the past when subduction largely ceased after the closure of a large ocean basin.

An important observation was made possible by his serendipitous observation of the 1994 Bolivia earthquake during a field campaign in the region: the data recorded by his broadband seismograph array showed that the source region of this event, which is the largest deep quake on record (as of November 2009), is in conflict with the generally accepted view that such quakes are caused by phase transformations of mantle minerals.

In a long-term study of small earthquakes triggered by a large event, the 1992 Landers, California earthquake, he and his colleagues discovered an annual cycle: fall had the greatest number of earthquakes, spring the least. The team found that this pattern could be related to barometric pressure changes: less pressure meant reduced stress on the faults, which permitted them to move more frequently. More recent work by him and his collaborators suggests that changes in the state of stress of the lithosphere induced by a large earthquake can alter the strength of faults and the seismic activity in an earthquake-prone area.

In 2008, Silver was co-author of a paper showing there were subtle changes in the speed of seismic waves that preceded two small earthquakes, encouraging results for the field of earthquake forecasting

In pursuit of his overarching goal of monitoring the deformation of the lithosphere on a continental scale, Silver played a key role in establishing the Plate Boundary Observatory, a part of the large EarthScope research program, which observes the tectonic activity throughout the western US and Alaska.

In memoriam to Silver, in 2012 the American Geophysical Union instigated the Paul G. Silver Award for Outstanding Scientific Service to be presented annually to recognize significant contributions to the fields of geodesy, seismology, or tectonophysics from a mid-career or senior scientist.

== Honors ==
Honors and awards

- President of the Seismology Section of the American Geophysical Union, 2004–2006
- Royal Astronomical Society Harold Jeffreys Lecturer (2005)
- Fellow of the American Academy of Arts and Sciences (since 2007)
- Fellow, American Geophysical Union
- Fellow, Geological Society of America
- Member, Phi Beta Kappa
