= USArray =

US earth science project collecting seismic images of the North American lithosphere

USArray (Seismic and Magnetotelluric Observatory) was one of the three components of the Earthscope project, the other two components being the Plate Boundary Observatory (PBO) and the San Andreas Fault Observatory at Depth (SAFOD). The components were funded by the National Science Foundation and were constructed, operated, and maintained as a collaborative effort with UNAVCO, the Incorporated Research Institutions for Seismology (IRIS), and Stanford University, with contributions from several other national and international organizations.

A major goal of USArray was to collect detailed seismic images of the North American lithosphere. The data collected from USArray was integrated with geologic observations made on the Earth's surface to help determine the geologic history of North America, as well as to better understand that geologic processes that are at work today.

== Arrays and Networks ==
USArray consists of four "observatories":

1. the Transportable Array.
2. the Flexible Array
3. the Reference Network.
4. the Magnetotelluric Array.

The Transportable Array (TA) was a network of 400 high-quality broadband seismographs on temporary sites that marched across the conterminous United States. The initial deployment, in August 2007, was in the western quarter of the United States. Since then the stations on the western edge were regularly relocated to the eastern edge at a rate of about four stations per week. The Transportable Array reached the East Coast in 2013, and wound up in 2017, having occupied nearly 2000 sites. An archive of stations are listed online.

Geological structures can be mapped by observing how they affect seismic waves from local and distant earthquakes, a process known as seismic tomography. The density of the TA network — typical station spacing of about 70 km — provided a level of resolution not previously available in many parts of the country and provided finer details of the lithosphere under parts of North America.

The Flexible Array was a pool of portable seismic instruments available for short-term high-density observations of particular areas of interest.

The Reference Network was an additional 100+ permanent stations located on approximately 300 km spacings that provided a long-term reference frame. These also augmented the USGS Advanced National Seismic System (ANSS), providing seismic observations in areas where instrumentation had been lacking.

The Magnetotelluric Array measured naturally occurring electric and magnetic fields. It consisted of seven permanent magnetotelluric (MT) stations and twenty portable stations.

== Data Management ==
Data from these instruments are available from the NSF SAGE Facility Data Services, operated by EarthScope Consortium (previously known as the IRIS Data Management Center).

== See also ==
- Array Network Facility
