= Yellowstone Volcano Observatory =

Research center in Wyoming, United States

Coordinates: 44.43025°N 110.671908°W

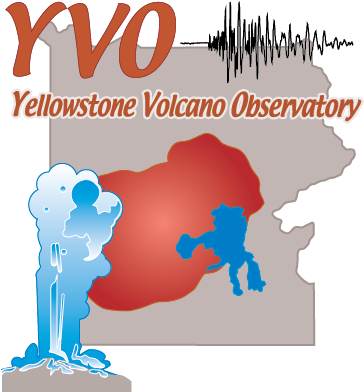
- Logo of the Yellowstone Volcano Observatory

Agency overview
- Formed: 2001
- Headquarters: Yellowstone National Park, Wyoming, USA
- Agency executive: Dr. Michael Poland, Scientist-in-Charge (USGS)
- Website: https://www.usgs.gov/observatories/yvo

The Yellowstone Volcano Observatory (YVO) is a volcano observatory that primarily monitors the Yellowstone Caldera in Yellowstone National Park in the United States. The observatory's jurisdiction also includes volcanic centers in the states of Colorado, Utah, Arizona, and New Mexico. As with other U.S. volcano observatories, it is funded through the United States Geological Survey Volcano Hazards Program.

Led by the U.S. Geological Survey, the observatory comprises nine member agencies:

- EarthScope Consortium
- Idaho Geological Survey
- Montana Bureau of Mines and Geology
- Montana State University
- National Park Service (NPS)
- University of Utah
- University of Wyoming
- Wyoming State Geological Survey
- Yellowstone National Park

== History ==
YVO was founded in 2001 as a three-way partnership between the USGS, the University of Utah, and the National Park Service (representing Yellowstone National Park). It was expanded in 2013 to include state Geological Survey organizations from Idaho, Montana, and Wyoming, UNAVCO (now known as EarthScope Consortium, since 2023), and the University of Wyoming. In 2020, Montana State University was included as the 9th member, to provide specialized geologic expertise in the Yellowstone region.

== Purpose ==
The purpose of the YVO is to monitor the volcanic system, to increase scientific understanding of the Yellowstone volcanic and hydrothermal system, and to disseminate data, interpretations, and accumulated knowledge to the public.

The observatory undertook a monitoring plan in 2006 that served as the basis for upgrades undertaken by the Plate Boundary Observatory, and by the USGS under the auspices of the American Recovery and Reinvestment Act of 2009.

In 2008, YVO published its initial response plan, that sets up a series of internal protocols for data gathering and deliberation during geological events at Yellowstone. Staff from the various observatory partner agencies form several monitoring and information teams that assess geological and geophysical data. The response plan also outlines how the observatory would interact with the incident command system.

YVO provides monthly updates through its website. It also releases informational statements for events that occur outside normal updates, through the VHP Alert Page. Individuals can receive automatic updates through the Volcano Notification Service.

== Media portrayal ==
In 2005, a BBC World Service's Discovery docudrama entitled "Supervolcano" was released on cable television. The film imagines the reaction of the Yellowstone Volcano Observatory to a supereruption at the Yellowstone Caldera.

Producer Ailsa Orr credited YVO scientists as inspiration for the film's three primary characters. The YVO Scientist-in-Charge reflected on the hype associated with volcanism at Yellowstone in a 2005 Geotimes magazine article.
