= Dam safety =

Dam safety may refer to:

- Dam safety systems - used for monitoring the safety status of dams
- Reservoir safety - the risks to dams and reservoirs and the legislation and guidelines in place to ensure dams and reservoirs are safe.
