= Array Network Facility =

The Array Network Facility component of the EarthScope USArray project was charged with ensuring all the real time seismic data collected from the Transportable Array and Flexible Arrays were transmitted, checked for quality, archived, and accessible online for researchers and the general public. The facility was part of the Scripps Institution of Oceanography at the University of California, San Diego. The principal investigator of the ANF was Dr. Frank Vernon.

The facility developed a series of online tools to allow researchers and the general public to interact with data collected from over four hundred broadband seismic stations across the United States. These four hundred stations made up the Transportable Array component of the EarthScope USArray project. Analysts reviewed automated event detections and produce event bulletins including seismic phase picks which were distributed through the IRIS DMC.

The ANF component of the USArray experiment was funded by the National Science Foundation.

== Sources ==
- USArray Array Network Facility (ANF): Metadata, Network and Data Monitoring, and Quality Assurance During the First Year of Operations (2004)
- The Earthscope USArray Array Network Facility (ANF): Metadata, Network and Data Monitoring, Quality Assurance During the Second Year of Operations (2005)
- The EarthScope USArray Array Network Facility (ANF): Metadata, Network and Data Monitoring, Quality Assurance During the Third Year of Operations (2006)
- Real-time operation of the NSF EarthScope USArray Transportable Array (2007)
- The Earthscope USArray Array Network Facility (ANF): Metadata, Network and Data Monitoring, Quality Assurance as We Start to Roll (2008)
- Data Latency Characteristics Observed Through Diverse Communication Links by the EarthScope USArray Transportable Array (2008)
- The EarthScope Array Network Facility: application-driven low-latency web-based tools for accessing high-resolution multi-channel waveform data (2008)
