= UNAVCO =

Organization

UNAVCO, Inc.
- Founded: 1984
- Purpose: Geodesy, data acquisition, scientific data archiving
- Location: Boulder, Colorado
- Coordinates: 40°03′40″N 105°12′21″W
- Website: www.unavco.org
- Formerly called: University NAVSTAR Consortium

UNAVCO was a non-profit university-governed consortium that facilitated geology research and education using geodesy.

== Background ==
UNAVCO was funded by the National Science Foundation (NSF), National Aeronautics and Space Administration (NASA), and United States Geological Survey (USGS) to support geology research. It operated the U.S. National Science Foundation's Geodetic Facility for the Advancement of Geoscience (GAGE Facility). UNAVCO had 120 US academic member organizations and supported over 110 organizations globally as associate members.

On January 1, 2023, UNAVCO merged with the Incorporated Research Institutions for Seismology (IRIS), operator of the U.S. National Science Foundation's Seismological Facility for the Advancement of Geoscience (SAGE Facility), to form EarthScope Consortium.

== Tools and services ==
=== Data ===
The UNAVCO GAGE Facility, as a World Data Center, provided access to scientific data for quantifying the motions of rock, ice, and water at or near the Earth's surface. Geodetic Imaging Data is collected by various sensors deployed on satellites, aircraft, and on the ground to provide high-resolution terrain models and deformation measurements. Data collected from strain and seismic borehole instruments is used to measure deformation on or near to the surface of the Earth as well as to measure the physical properties of rock within the vicinity of the installations. At many of the geodetic measurement sites, meteorological data are also collected to aid with processing of the geodetic data. UNAVCO archived and distributed data from the EarthScope program Plate Boundary Observatory, which later became part of the Network of the Americas (NOTA).

=== GPS/GNSS systems ===
The UNAVCO GAGE Facility managed a community pool of high accuracy portable GPS/GNSS receiver systems used for a range of research applications.

=== Terrestrial laser scanning ===
The GAGE Facility at UNAVCO maintained a pool of Terrestrial Laser Scanning (TLS) instruments to support Earth science investigators. TLS technology is based on lidar (Light Detection And Ranging) and is sometimes referred to as ground-based lidar or tripod lidar. It is an active imaging system whereby laser pulses are emitted by the scanner and the time and intensity of the returning pulses, reflected by the surface or object being scanned, are recorded. The round-trip time for pulses enables the taking of millions/billions of points, from which a 3D "point cloud" is generated to accurately map the scanned surface/object.

The primary capability of TLS is the generation of high-resolution 3D maps and images of surfaces and objects over scales of meters to kilometers with centimeter to sub-centimeter precision. Repeat TLS measurements allow the imaging and measurement of changes through time and in unprecedented detail, making TLS even more valuable for transformative science investigations.

Geology applications include detailed mapping of fault scarps, geologic outcrops, fault-surface roughness, frost polygons, lava lakes, dikes, fissures, glaciers, columnar joints and hillside drainages. Carrying out additional TLS surveys can be useful in the imaging and measurement of surface changes over time due to, for example:

- Surface processes
- Volcanic deformation
- Ice flow
- Beach morphology transitions
- Post-seismic slip

The incorporation of GNSS/GPS measurements provides accurate georeferencing of TLS data in an absolute reference frame. The addition of digital photography can be used to create photorealistic 3D images.

=== Polar services ===
The UNAVCO GAGE Facility provided geodetic support to NSF-OPP (National Science Foundation Office of Polar Programs) funded researchers working in the Arctic and Antarctic. Survey-grade GPS receivers, Terrestrial Laser Scanners, and supporting power and communications systems for continuous data collection and campaign surveying could be provided. Operation and maintenance services were also provided for long term data collection, with on-line data distribution from the UNAVCO community archive.

=== NASA and IGS support ===
The UNAVCO GAGE Facility provided global infrastructure support to NASA/JPL in operating a collection of globally distributed permanent GNSS/GPS stations called the NASA Global GNSS Network (GGN), which forms part of the International GNSS Service (IGS) network.

=== Plate Boundary Observatory (PBO) ===
UNAVCO operated the Plate Boundary Observatory (PBO), the geodetic component of the EarthScope program funded by the National Science Foundation. The PBO consisted of several major observatory components: a network of 1,100+ permanent, continuously operating Global Positioning System (GPS) stations many of which provided data at high-rate and in real-time, 78 borehole seismometers, 74 borehole strainmeters, 28 shallow borehole tilt meters, and six long baseline laser strain meters.

=== Continuously Operating Caribbean GPS Observational Network (COCONet) ===
UNAVCO operated the Continuously Operating Caribbean GNSS/GPS Observational Network (COCONet), which consisted of 50 planned continuously operating GPS/weather stations integrated with 65 existing GPS stations operated by partner organizations. COCONet provides open-format GPS and meteorological data for these stations for use by scientists, government agencies, educators, students, and the private sector.

== Organization ==
UNAVCO was organized into three programs. The three programs focused on:

- Data collection, including installation and maintenance of large-scale geodetic instrument networks (Geodetic Infrastructure)
- Network data operations, community data products, and cyber infrastructure (Geodetic Data Services)
- Education and outreach strategies (Education and Community Engagement)

=== Geodetic Infrastructure ===
The Geodetic Infrastructure (GI) program integrated all geodetic infrastructure and data acquisition capabilities for continuously operating observational networks and shorter-term deployments. Supported activities included development and testing, advanced systems engineering, the construction, operation, and maintenance of permanent geodetic instrument networks around the globe. Major projects supported by the GI program included the 1,112 station Plate Boundary Observatory (PBO), Polar networks in Greenland and Antarctica (GNET and ANET, together known as POLENET), COCONet spanning the Caribbean plate boundary, the multi-disciplinary AfricaArray, and several other smaller continuously observing geodetic networks.

=== Geodetic Data Services ===
Geodetic Data Services (GDS) program provided services for the long-term stewardship of data sets. These services organized, managed, and archived data, and developed tools for data access and interpretation. Services were provided for GNSS/GPS data, imaging data, strain and seismic data, and meteorological data. The UNAVCO Data Archive included more than 2,300 continuous GNSS/GPS stations.

=== Education and Community Engagement ===
The Education and Community Engagement program provided services to communicate the scientific results of the geodetic community, foster education, and grow workforce development and international partnerships. Particular focus was given to providing training, developing educational materials, and facilitating technical short courses to scientists studying geodesy. The program also supported formal education (K-12) and informal public outreach through workshops, educational materials for secondary students and undergraduate level courses, museum displays, and social media interactions.

UNAVCO supported geo-workforce development through undergraduate internship programs, graduate student mentoring, and online resources. This included the Research Experience in the Solid Earth Science for Students (RESESS) internship program. RESESS was a summer internship program dedicated to increasing the diversity of students entering the geosciences.

== Membership and governance ==
UNAVCO Members were educational or non-profit institutions chartered in the United States (US) or its Territories with a commitment to scholarly research involving the application of high precision geodesy to Earth science or related fields. Associate Membership was available to organizations other than U.S. educational institutions, when those organizations shared UNAVCO's mission and otherwise met the qualifications for membership.

A board of directors was charged with UNAVCO oversight and governance and was elected by designated representatives of UNAVCO member institutions. Advisory committees for each of the three programs guided the focus of the programs.

== Science ==
Space-based geodetic observations have enabled measurement of the motions of the Earth's surface and crust at many different scales, leading to discoveries in continental deformation, plate boundary processes, the earthquake cycle, continental groundwater storage, and hydrologic loading.

=== Solid earth ===
The Earth's tectonic plates are continuously in motion, though so slowly that even with the highest-precision instruments, months or years of observations are necessary to measure it. The advent of space-based geodetic techniques improved the ability to measure tectonic plate motion and to establish stable terrestrial and celestial reference frames required to improve accuracy. Geodetic research associated with earthquakes, volcanoes, and landslides aims to provide early warnings and mitigate future hazard events.

=== Cryosphere ===
Ice covers approximately 10% of Earth's land surface at the present, with most of the ice mass being contained in the Greenland and Antarctic continental ice sheets. Designing and undertaking geodetic experiments that enable researchers to improve the understanding of ice dynamics allows stronger predictions (through numerical models) of the response of the glaciers to changing climates.

=== Environmental and hydrogeodesy ===
Because it is sensitive to mass redistribution and accurate distance measurements, geodesy contributes to research about issues relating to water and the environment. Geodetic observations enable researchers to follow the motion of water within Earth's system at global scales and to characterize changes in terrestrial groundwater storage at a variety of scales, ranging from continental-scale changes in water storage using gravity space missions, to regional and local changes using INSAR, GNSS, leveling, and relative gravity measurements of surface deformation accompanying aquifer-system compaction.

=== Atmosphere ===
Space geodesy utilizes electromagnetic signals propagating through the atmosphere, providing information on tropospheric temperature and water vapor and on ionospheric electron density.
