= San Andreas Fault Observatory at Depth =

Deep borehole intersecting the San Andreas Fault

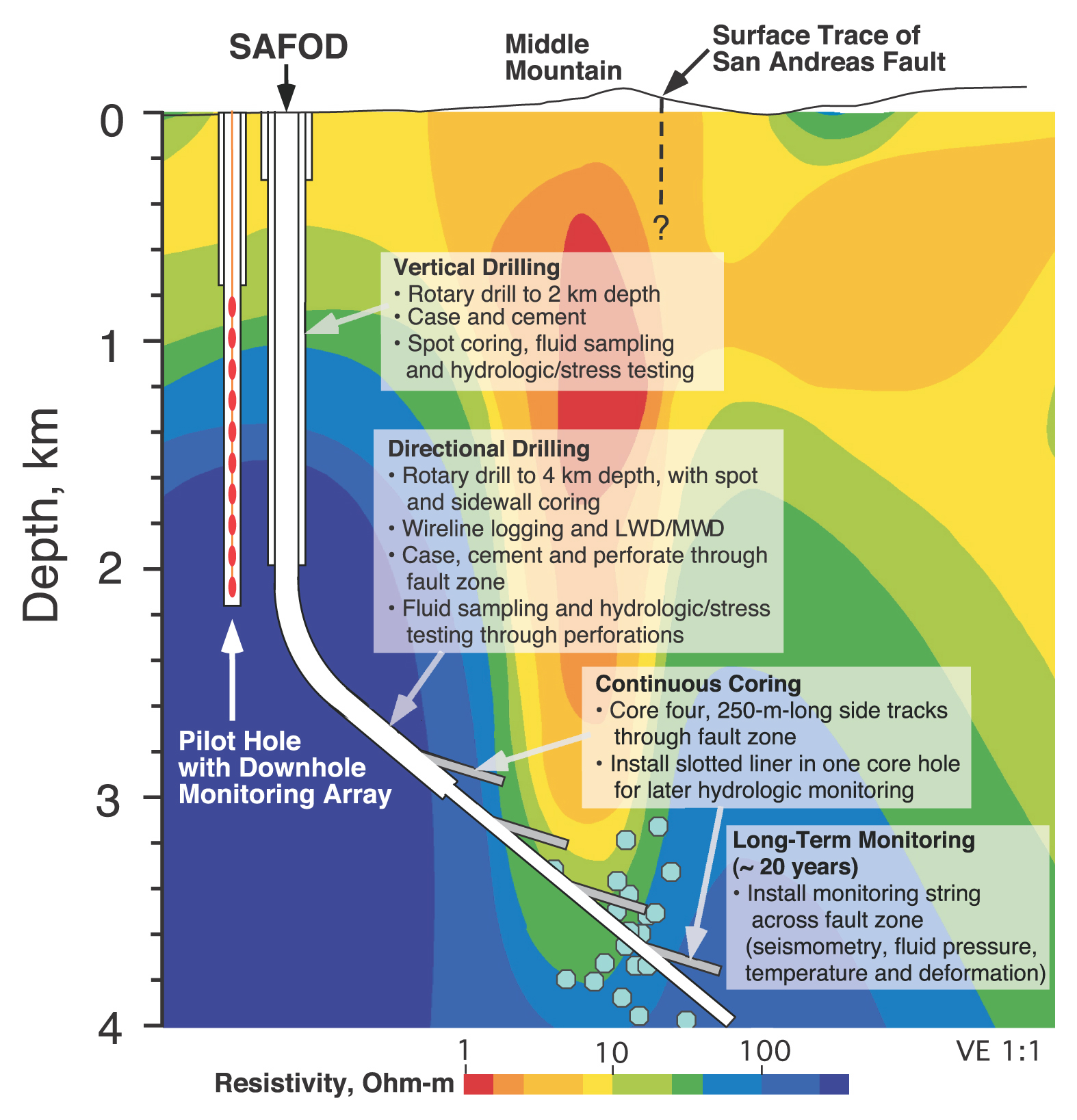
- Schematic representation of the SAFOD borehole and pilot hole
- Interactive map of San Andreas Fault Observatory at Depth
- Location: Parkfield, California, U.S.; 35.974204°N 120.552141°W
- Greatest depth: 3.2 km (2 miles)
- Opened: 2002
- Company: National Science Foundation
- Website: www.earthscope-program-2003-2018.org/about/observatories.html

The San Andreas Fault Observatory at Depth (SAFOD) was a research project that began in 2002 aimed at collecting geological data about the San Andreas Fault for the purpose of predicting and analyzing future earthquakes. The site consists of a 2.2 km (1.4 miles) pilot hole and a 3.2 km (2 miles) main hole. Drilling operations ceased in 2007. Located near the town of Parkfield, California, the project installed geophone sensors and GPS clocks in a borehole that cut directly through the fault. This data, along with samples collected during drilling, helped shed new light on geochemical and mechanical properties around the fault zone.

SAFOD was part of EarthScope, an Earth science program using geological and geophysical techniques to explore the structure of the North American continent and to understand the origin of earthquakes and volcanoes. Earthscope was funded by the National Science Foundation in conjunction with the U.S. Geological Survey and NASA. Data collected at SAFOD are available from The Northern California Earthquake Data Center at UC Berkeley and from NSF SAGE Facility Data Services operated by EarthScope Consortium, formerly known as the IRIS DMC.

== See also ==
- Chikyū Hakken, deep oceanic drilling program
- Integrated Ocean Drilling Program
- Kola Borehole (1970–2005, 12,262 m or 40,230 feet)
- KTB Borehole (1987–1995, 9,101 m or 29,859 feet)
- Mohorovičić discontinuity
- Project Mohole
