= Terry Wilson (scientist) =

International leader in the study of present-day tectonics in Antarctica

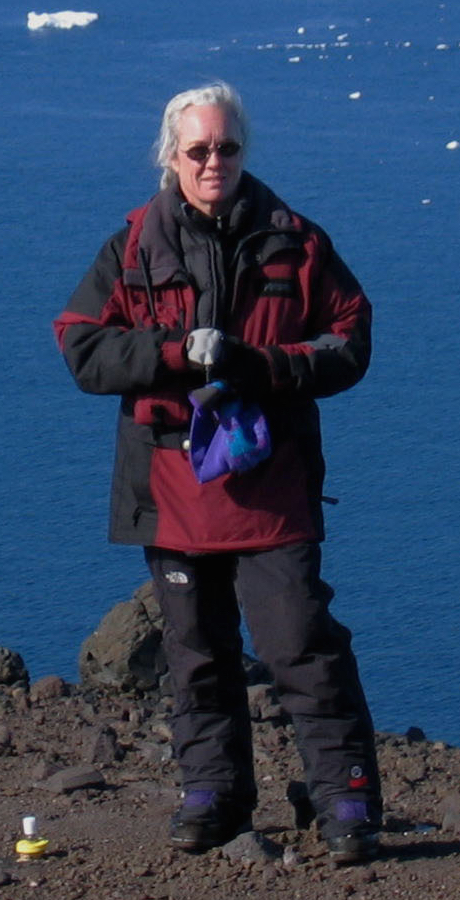
- Terry Wilson at Franklin Island
- Born: 1954 (age 71–72)
- Education: Columbia University
- Known for: Principal Investigator of POLENET; Vice President of the Scientific Committee on Antarctic Research
- Scientific career
- Fields: Geology
- Workplaces: Ohio State University; Scientific Committee on Antarctic Research

Terry Jean Wilson (born 1954) is an international leader in the study of present-day tectonics in Antarctica. She has led large, international efforts, such as Polar Earth Observing Network (POLENET), to investigate the interactions between the Earth's crust and the cryosphere in Antarctica.

== Early life and education ==
Wilson received her BS from the University of Michigan and Ph.D. from Lamont Doherty Geological Observatory and Columbia University in 1983.

== Career and impact ==
Wilson is based at Ohio State University, where she investigates the Earth's structural architecture, the interaction between ice sheets in Antarctica and the solid Earth, and neotectonic rifting. Her research integrates satellite remote sensing, Global Positioning Systems, both airborne and marine geophysical data and microstructural and structural mapping of faults in sedimentary and outcrop rock cores.

== Awards and honors ==
Wilson has held several high-profile leadership positions in Antarctic Science:

- Vice President of the Scientific Committee on Antarctic Research (SCAR).
- USA's delegate to SCAR, serving as VP.
- Chief Officer of SCARs Scientific research programme, ‘Solid Earth Response and influence on Cryosphere Evolution’ (SERCE).
- Leader of the geoscience component of the first Antarctic Science Horizon Scan.
- Principal Investigator of POLENET, a major Antarctic programme devoted to observing the polar regions and investigating ice sheet behaviour in a changing world.
- 2023 Ivan I. Mueller Award for Distinguished Service and Leadership by the American Geophysical Union (AGU)

== Selected works ==
- Wilson, T.J., 1999. Cenozoic structural segmentation of the Transantarctic Mountains rift flank in southern Victoria Land. Global and Planetary Change,23(1), pp. 105–127.
- Wilson, T.J., Grunow, A.M. and Hanson, R.E., 1997. Gondwana assembly: the view from southern Africa and East Gondwana. Journal of Geodynamics,23(3), pp. 263–286.
- Fielding, C.R., Whittaker, J., Henrys, S.A., Wilson, T.J. and Naish, T.R., 2008. Seismic facies and stratigraphy of the Cenozoic succession in McMurdo Sound, Antarctica: Implications for tectonic, climatic and glacial history. Palaeogeography, Palaeoclimatology, Palaeoecology, 260(1), pp. 8–29.
- Lough, A.C., Wiens, D.A., Barcheck, C.G., Anandakrishnan, S., Aster, R.C., Blankenship, D.D., Huerta, A.D., Nyblade, A., Young, D.A. and Wilson, T.J., 2013. Seismic detection of an active subglacial magmatic complex in Marie Byrd Land, Antarctica. Nature Geoscience, 6(12), pp. 1031–1035.
- Kennicutt, M.C., Chown, S.L., Cassano, J.J., Liggett, D., Massom, R., Peck, L.S., Rintoul, S.R., Storey, J.W.V., Vaughan, D.G., Wilson, T.J. and Sutherland, W.J., 2014. Six priorities for Antarctic science. Nature,512(7512), pp. 23–25.
