= Deformation (volcanology) =

Change in the shape of a volcano or the land surrounding it

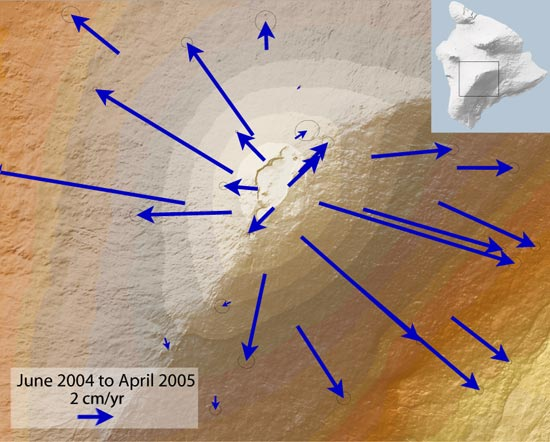
Summit inflation at Mauna Loa, as indicated by GPS measurements between June 2004 and April 2005.

In volcanology, deformation refers to the change in the shape of a volcano or the surrounding landscape due to the movement of magma. This can be in the form of inflation, which is a response to pressurization, or deflation, which is a response to depressurization. Inflation is represented by swelling of the ground surface, a volcanic edifice, or a subsurface magma body. It can be caused by magma accumulation, exsolution of volatiles, geothermal processes, heating, and tectonic compression. Deflation is represented by shrinking of the ground surface, a volcanic edifice, or a subsurface magma body. It can be caused by magma withdrawal (related to intrusion or eruption), volatile escape, thermal contraction, phase changes during crystallization, and tectonic extension. Deformation is a key indicator of pre-eruptive unrest at many active volcanoes, but deformation signals must be used in combination with other eruption indicators for forecasting reliability.

== Magma movement processes ==
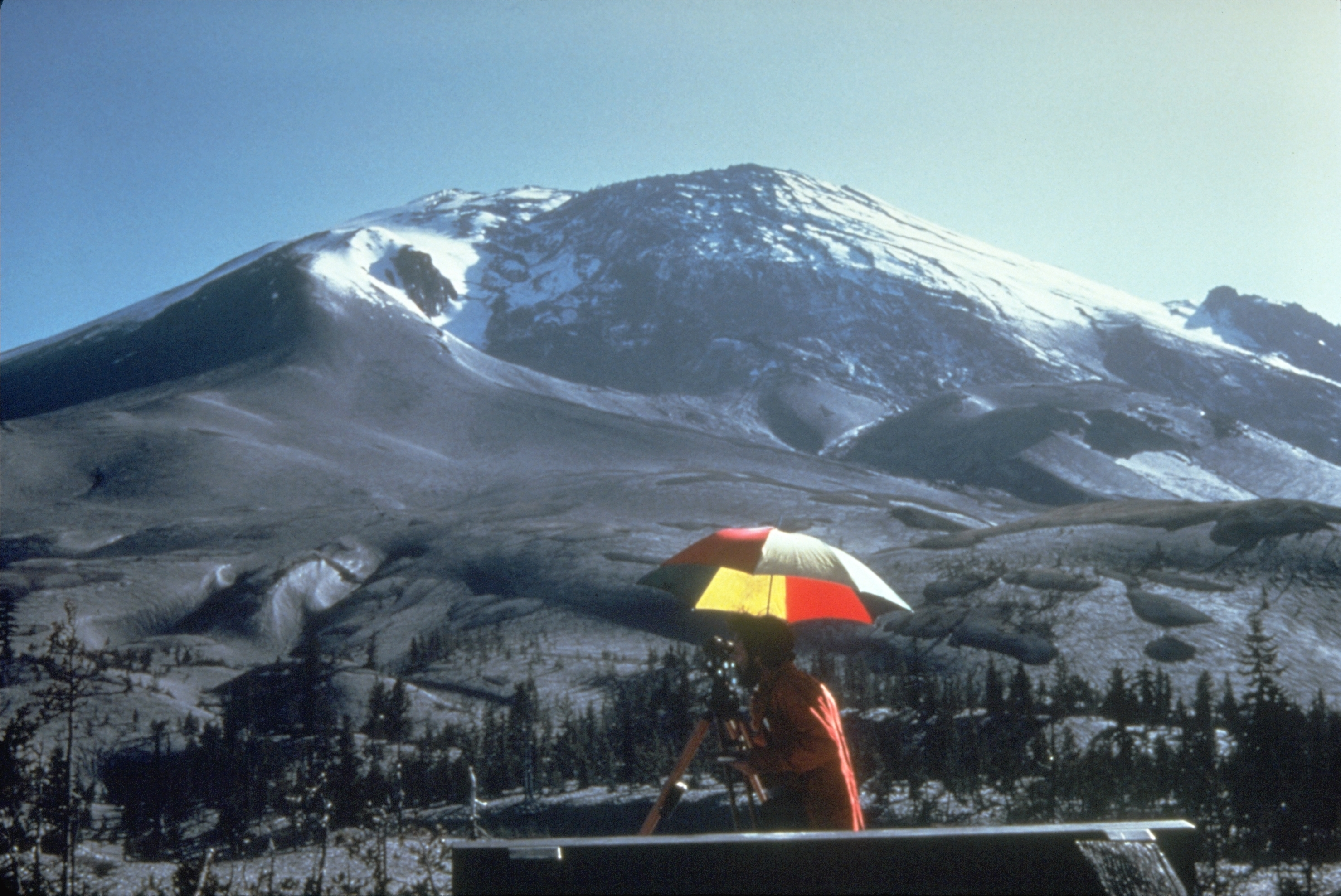
A cryptodome developed on the north side of Mount St. Helens prior to its 1980 eruption as magma pushed up within the peak.

As magma accumulates in an underground reservoir, or magma chamber, before an eruption, the ground surface typically undergoes inflation. If silicic magma intrudes very near the surface but does not breach to the surface, it may form a bulge on the surface known as a cryptodome. Deflation involves the subsidence of the surface due to the rapid movement of magma, which is either intruded elsewhere or erupted. Although deformation is frequently related to subsurface magmatic movements, other processes may contribute as well. This is particularly true for subglacial volcanoes, which may undergo inflation or deflation due to size variations of the overlying ice cap. An example of this phenomenon has been demonstrated for Katla, an active volcano under Mýrdalsjökull in the south of Iceland.

== Monitoring and modeling techniques ==
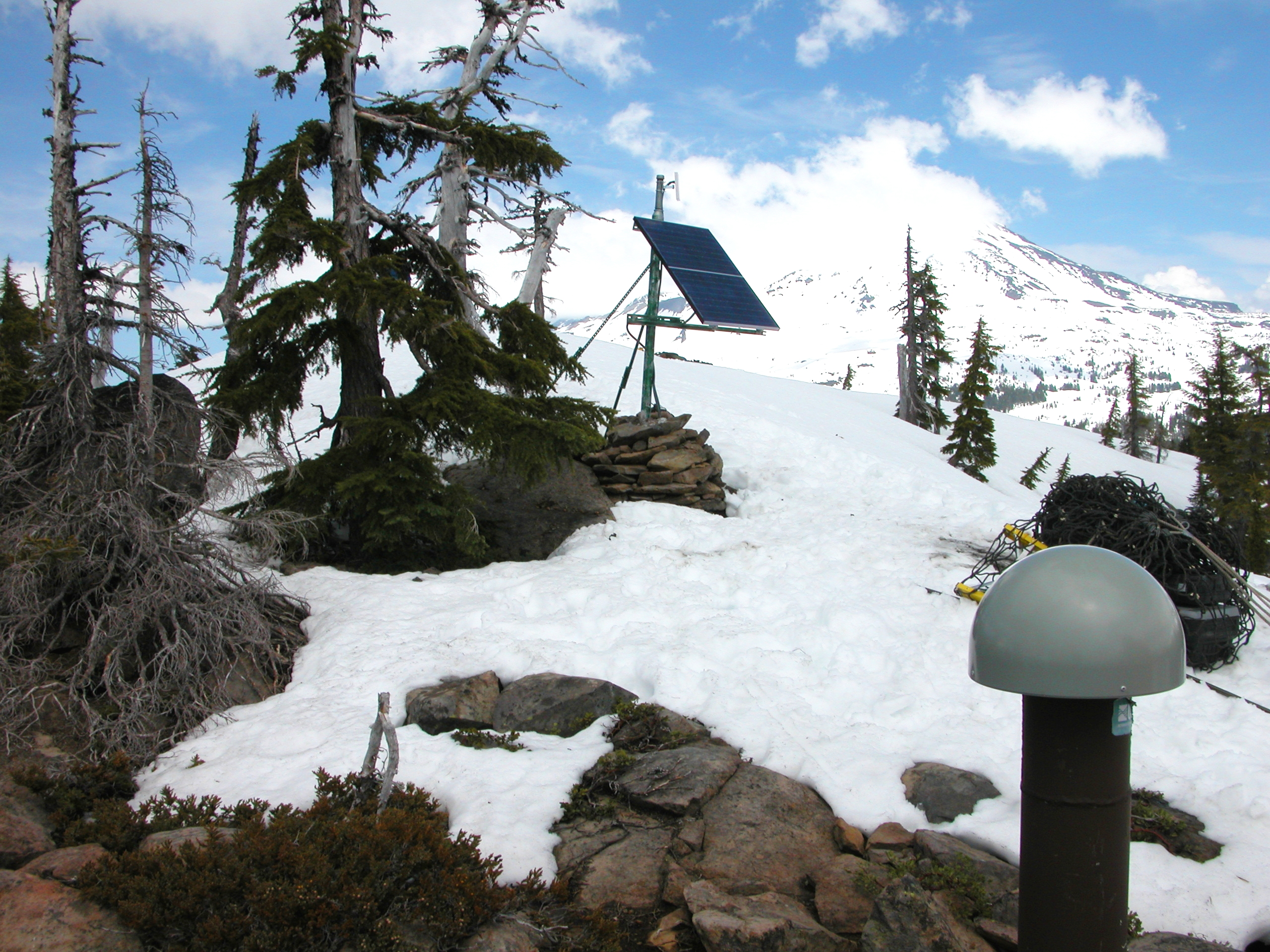
USGS GPS Station, The Husband, Three Sisters, Oregon.

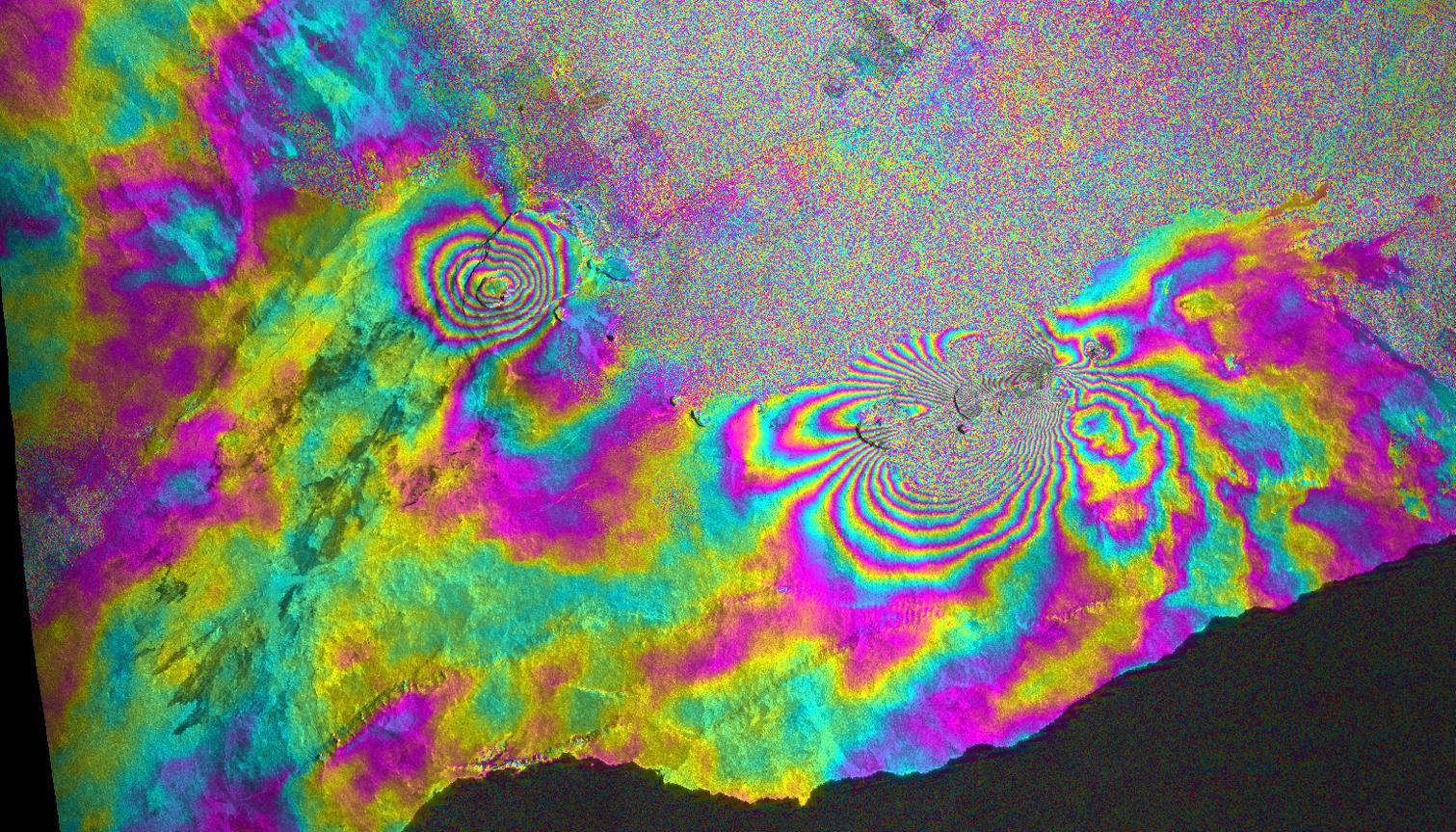
Interferogram produced with the Italian Space Agency's (ASI) constellation of COSMO-SkyMed radar satellites over Kilauea, Hawaii, showing ground deformation after an eruption on 5 March 2011.

GPS, tilt, InSAR, and seismicity are the primary methods used to track ground movement. Global Position System (GPS) measurements can be used to estimate the location and amount of magma accumulating beneath the surface via both vertical and lateral movement. For example, the Hawaiian volcano Mauna Loa has experienced multiple episodes of inflation since its 1984 eruption, and it has been well documented since the mid-1990s. Ground tilt is continuously recorded with electronic tiltmeters installed in drill holes about 4 m (13 ft) beneath the ground surface—a location that insulates the instruments from the effects of environmental (temperature and wind) and cultural noise. Rapid changes in tilt are usually detected in the hours to days before an intrusion or eruption. InSAR (Interferometric Synthetic Aperture Radar) uses multiple radar images of the ground that are collected by airplanes or orbiting satellites to make maps of ground deformation. Because InSAR detects deformation over broad areas, it is an excellent tool, often in conjunction with GPS, for mapping both large- and small-scale changes. Each of these fine-scale measurement techniques are necessary to grasp the centimeter-scale deformation that volcanoes often exhibit leading up to eruption.

Seismology offers a more passive approach to volcanic monitoring. In addition to the previously stated techniques of monitoring ground deformation, varying frequencies of seismic energy may be recorded in order to infer magma movement. Volcanic earthquakes, or volcanic-tectonic earthquakes, can be caused by the movement of magma or other volcanic fluids, inducing tectonic stress that leads to earthquakes of high frequency. Lower frequency volcanic earthquakes, a result of resonation (physical oscillation from seismic waves) in cracks due to magma movement, may also be detected by seismograms.

== Eruption signaling ==
Ground deformation measurements are crucial in volcano monitoring as they provide an important indicator of what is happening beneath a volcano. Forecasting a volcanic eruption in terms of timing and scale is difficult, although various approaches are used in attempt to do so. One approach, the materials failure forecast method, involves the monitoring of deformation signals over time, with a threshold value being monitored. Deformation alone cannot be used as a sole indicator of imminent eruption, as magma movement frequently occurs without eruption. However, paired with other signaling processes such as volatile exsolution and seismicity, forecasting reliability improves.
