= Dam safety system =

Emergency alert system for dams

Dam safety systems are used to monitor the state of dams, including external physical threats to the dams, and issuing emergency warnings at various degrees of automation. This includes the use of differential GPS and SAR remote sensing to monitor the risks imposed by landslides and subsidence. For large dams, seismographs are used to detect reservoir-induced seismicity that could threaten the stability of the dam. The output of these systems can provide warning to the local population ahead of a potential collapse.

== Particular applications ==
=== Ukraine ===
The monitoring and warning system safeguarding the Kyiv Reservoir dam is complicated enough to include protection from a space object impact.

=== Italy ===
The dam monitoring system of Enel green Power in the Riolunato Dam controls all of the dam's important parameters. Optical and physical alignment systems are installed to control any movement of the land under and around the dam. The dam monitoring system checks the level of the water because this creates different pressures on the dam, also in relation to the air and water temperature. All these parameters are controlled and compared with the deformation and stress applied on the structure of the dam, measured with extensimeter, pendulum, reverse pendulum, piezometer, etc. The dam monitoring system continuously stores and analyzes all the dam parameters, creating 5 typologies of alarms. The dam monitoring system sets different levels of alarms corresponding to specific risks, like a reduction of lake water levels, and communicates risks with a network of all dam control systems. When the level of risk increases, the monitoring system activates alarms to close roads or bridges, and eventually alerts people living in nearby villages. All data is continuously sent from the dam monitoring system to the network dam control system, where specialist engineers can make decisions regarding the emergency situation. The Riolunato dam monitoring local system software is developed from AuCo Solutions.

=== United States ===
Dam safety systems became a focus of multi-agency regulations during the U.S. Army Corps of Engineers construction of large flood control and hydro-electric power generation projects. To help benchmark proven practices, the Association of State Dam Safety Officials (ASDSO) formed a national non-profit organization of state and federal dam safety regulators, dam owners and operators, engineering consultants, manufacturers and suppliers, academia, contractors and others interested in dams safety. More recently public safety concerns were addressed by the Indian Dams Safety Act of 1992 during hearings before the Select Committee on Indian Affairs, United States Senate, 102nd Congress, second session, on S. 2617. The purpose was to provide for the maintenance of dams located on Indian lands in New Mexico by the Bureau of Indian Affairs through contracts with the Indian tribes. (August 4, 1992 in Washington, D.C.)

The ASDSO Conference Proceedings paper by Gary R. Holtzhausen (1991) describes the effective use of tiltmeters with remote sensing to provide reliable low-cost early warning of impending structural failures.

The ASDSO Conference Proceedings paper by Barry K. Meyers (2002) describes two case studies using failure modes analysis together with a variety of automated instrumentation to provide early warnings at White River Project owned by Puget Sound Energy as well as a case study of the Silver Creek Dam near Silverton OR.

== See also ==
- Threat of the Dnieper reservoirs
- Operation Chastise
- Expert system
- Reservoir safety
