= Deformation monitoring =

Method of measurement

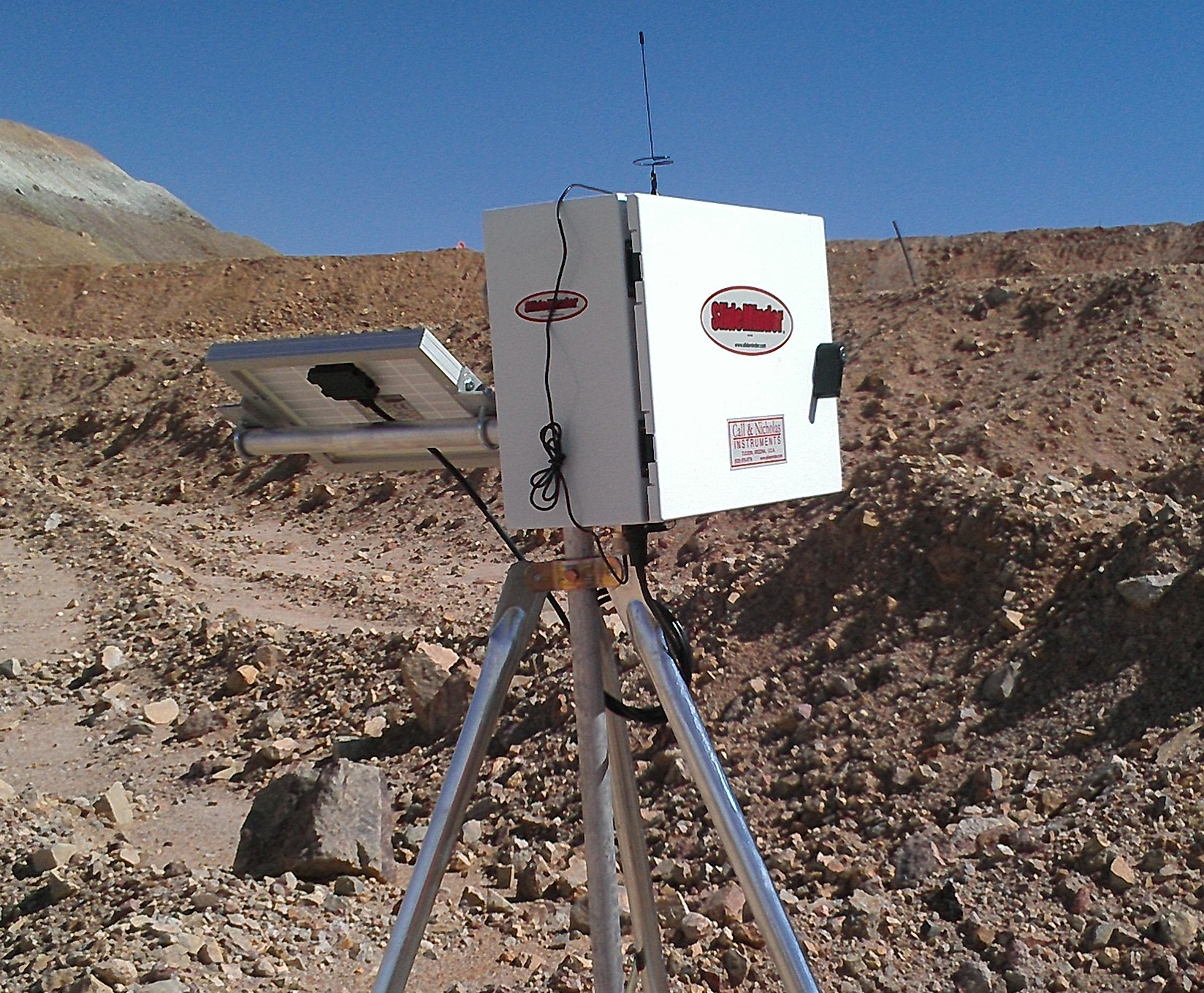
A radio telemetry wireline extensometer monitoring slope deformation.

Deformation monitoring (also referred to as deformation survey) is the systematic measurement and tracking of the alteration in the shape or dimensions of an object as a result of stresses induced by applied loads. Deformation monitoring is a major component of logging measured values that may be used for further computation, deformation analysis, predictive maintenance, and alarming.

Deformation monitoring is primarily associated with the field of applied surveying but may also be relevant to civil engineering, mechanical engineering, construction, and geology. The measurement devices utilized for deformation monitoring depend on the application, the chosen method, and the preferred measurement interval.

== Measuring devices ==
A standard geodetic monitoring instrument in the Freeport open pit mine, Indonesia

GNSS reference station antenna for structural monitoring of the Jiangying Bridge

Measuring devices (or sensors) can be sorted in two main groups: geodetic and geotechnical sensors. Both measuring devices can be seamlessly combined in modern deformation monitoring.

- Geodetic measuring devices measure georeferenced (relative to established locations outside the monitoring area) displacements or movements in one, two or three dimensions. It includes the use of instruments such as total stations, levels, InSAR, and global navigation satellite system receivers.
- Geotechnical measuring devices measure displacements or movements and related environmental effects or conditions without external georeferencing. It includes the use of instruments such as extensometers, piezometers, pressuremeters, rain gauges, thermometers, barometers, tiltmeters, accelerometers, seismometers, etc.

== Application ==
Deformation monitoring can be required for the following applications:

- Dams
- Roads
- Tunnels
- Bridges and Viaducts
- High-rise and historical buildings
- Foundations
- Construction sites
- Mining
- Landslide areas
- Volcanoes
- Settlement areas
- Earthquake areas
- Land subsidence areas

== Methods ==
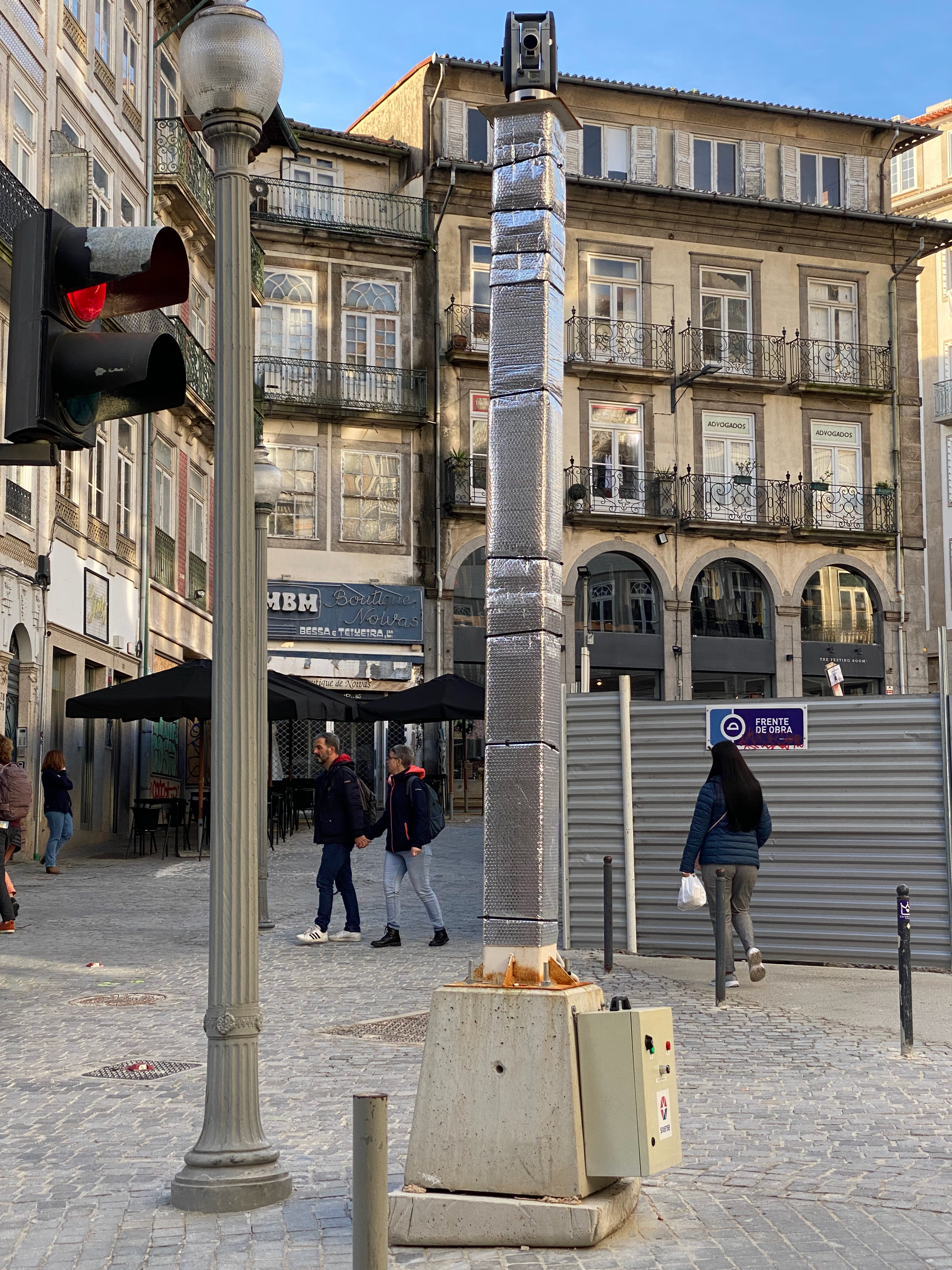
Automatic deformation monitoring device at a construction site of Porto Metro

Deformation monitoring can be manual or automatic. Manual deformation monitoring is the operation of sensors or instruments by hand or manual downloading of collected data from deformation monitoring instruments. Automatic deformation monitoring operation of a group of software and hardware elements for deformation monitoring that, once set up, does not require human input to function.

Note that deformation analysis and interpretation of the data collected by the monitoring system is not included in this definition.

Automated deformation monitoring requires instruments to communicate with a base station. Communication methods used include:

- Transmission cable (RS-232, RS-485, fiber optics)
- Local area network (LAN)
- Wireless LAN (WLAN)
- Mobile communication (GSM, GPRS, UMTS)
- WiMax

== Regularity and scheduling ==
The monitoring regularity and time interval of the measurements must be considered depending on the application and object to be monitored. Objects can undergo both rapid, high frequency movement and slow, gradual movement. For example, a bridge might oscillates with a period of a few seconds due to the influence of traffic and wind and also be shifting gradually due to tectonic changes.

- Regularity: ranges from a days, weeks or years for manual monitoring and continuous for automatic monitoring systems.
- Measurement interval: ranges from fractions of a second to hours.

== Deformation analysis ==
Deformation analysis is concerned with determining if a measured displacement is significant enough to warrant a response. Deformation data must be checked for statistical significance, and then checked against specified limits, and reviewed to see if movements below specified limits imply potential risks.

The software acquires data from sensors, computes meaningful values from the measurements, records results, and can notify responsible persons should threshold value be exceeded. However, a human operator must make considered decisions on the appropriate response to the movement, e.g. independent verification though on-site inspections, re-active controls such as structural repairs and emergency responses such as shut down processes, containment processes and site evacuation.

== See also ==
- Engineering Geology
- Slope stability
  - Slope stability radar
- Structural health monitoring
