= COCONet =

GPS network

Continuously Operating Caribbean GPS Observational Network (COCONet) was a global positioning system (GPS) observation network that spanned across the Caribbean and the neighboring area It was part of UNAVCO (University Navstar Corporation). UNAVCO and IRIS (Incorporated Research Institutions for Seismology) Consortium later merged to create EarthScope Consortium in 2023.

The project was initiated after the devastation of the 2010 Haiti Earthquake, which was a 7.0 Mw earthquake. Starting from 2011, UNAVCO built and operated COCONet for the National Science Foundation (NSF). It was a network of continuous GPS meteorology or cGPS/Met sites. Along with the NSF-funded TLALOCNet GPS network in Mexico, the two networks of cGPS-Met instrumentation were available to support research in Mexico, Central America, and the Caribbean.

== Function ==
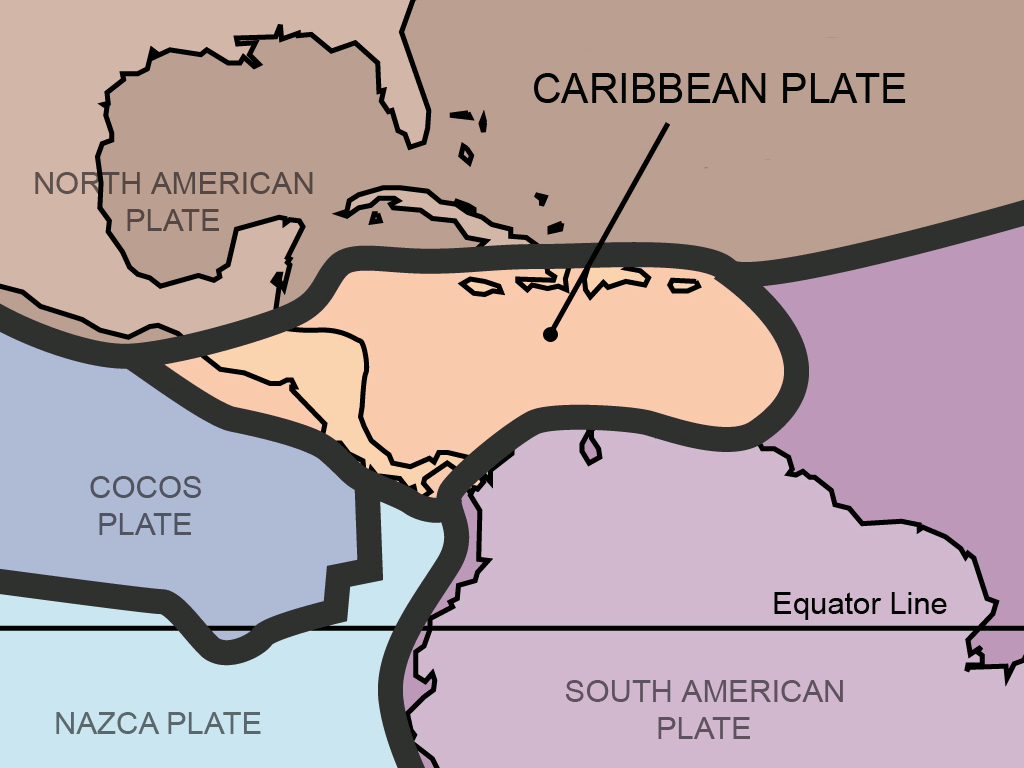

The purpose of COCOnet was to:

- Provide details on the tectonics of the entire Caribbean region.
- Enhance atmospheric observations that can be used for testing and validation of climate and weather models.
- Improve the analysis of local geodetic (the science of planetary measurement) measurements by providing access to an integrated backbone electronic network of reference stations.
- Increase our ability to model and predict the natural hazards (earthquakes, hurricanes and so on) in the region.

To accomplish the function of climate modeling and other objectives., the network also had tide gauges in Mexico, Jamaica, the Dominican Republic, and Panama. In terms of atmospheric measurements and related goals, the COCOnet stations were able to assist the Constellation Observing System for Meteorology, Ionosphere, and Climate of the University Corporation for Atmospheric Research (UCAR/COSMIC) as it created continuous estimates of precipitable water vapor.

== Stations ==
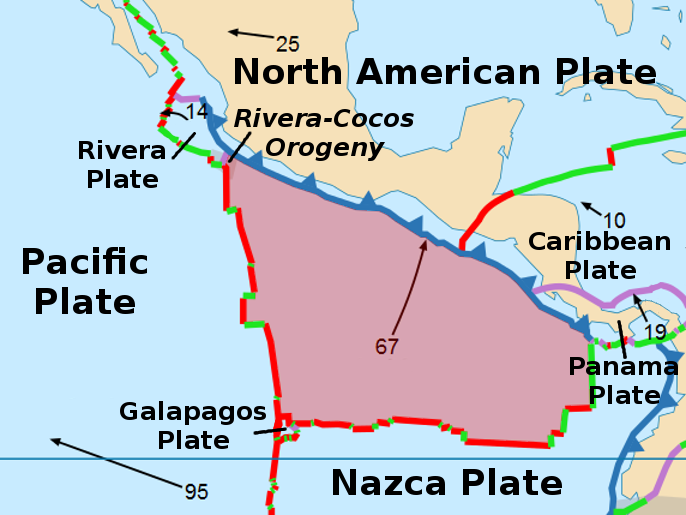
The Cocos Plate.

A notable station is the station on the isolated Isla del Coco (Cocos Island), Costa Rica, in that it is the only GPS station continuously tracking the Cocos Plate, as it passes underneath the Caribbean Plate, at a rate of 78 millimeters (mm) per year. Because the island is the only land mass of the Cocos Plate that is above sea level, this was the only place where Cocos Plate motion observations could be measured in this GPS network. A continuous GPS station was built and instrumented on the island in May 2011. Data from the station show a steady motion of the island at a speed of 90.9±1.5mm/yr. or approximately 90 millimeters a year.

== Partnerships ==
The following organizations were members of the partnership for the network when it had existed:

- Universidad Politécnica de Ingeniería (UPI) (Honduras)
- Puerto Rico Seismic Network
- Instituto Sismológico Universitario (ISU) - Autonomous University of Santo Domingo (UASD)
- Oficina Nacional de Meteorología (ONAMET) (Dominican Republic)
- University of Zulia, Venezuela
- National Meteorological Service (Mexico)
- Nicaraguan Institute of Territorial Studies Intra-Americas Studies of Climate Processes
- Jamaica Climate Service
- Pennsylvania State University
- State University Haiti
- Colombian Institute for Hydrology, Meteorology and Environmental Studies
- Geographic Institute of Venezuela Simón Bolívar
- Venezuelan Foundation for Seismological Research
- National Geographic Institute of El Salvador
- University of Texas, Arlington
- Camagüey Meteorological Center (Camagüey, Cuba)
- National Geographic Institute of Honduras
- Panama Canal Authority
- Caribbean Community Climate Change Centre, Belize
- Volcanological and Seismological Observatory of Costa Rica
- University of the West Indies - Seismic Research Center
- Institut de Physique du Globe de Paris
- Montserrat Volcano Observatory (Caribbean island of Montserrat)
- Purdue University
- University of Puerto Rico, Mayagüez
- Meteorological Service of the Netherlands, Antilles, and Aruba
- University of Arizona
- University of Technology, Jamaica
- Colombian Institute of Geology and Mining
- National Geographic Institute, Guatemala City
- National Autonomous University of Honduras
- University Corporation for Atmospheric Research (UCAR)
- National Autonomous University of Mexico (UNAM)
- National Oceanic and Atmospheric Administration (NOAA)
- U.S. Geological Survey (USGS)
- National Aeronautics and Space Administration (NASA)
- National Science Foundation (NSF)
- Bahamas Department of Meteorology
- Meteorological Department Curaçao
- Earthquake Unit, Jamaica
- Real Estate Jurisdiction of the Dominican Republic
- Universidad Nacional Pedro Henriquez Ureña (UNPHU) (Dominican Republic)

== Meetings and workshops ==
COCOnet had held for workshops. The meetings can help to understand the history of the project:

The original COCONet project proposal was covered in three workshops:

- The first one was planned to be held in San Juan, Puerto Rico (February 3–4, 2011)
- The second meeting was to be held in Port-of-Spain, Trinidad, Republic of Trinidad & Tobago (June 28–29, 2011) with one of several goals being for Caribbean network operators to address the specifics of choosing existing and new stations.
- The third COCONet workshop focused primarily on longer-term operations and maintenance for GPS stations installed in the Caribbean, and related issues.

== Data centers ==
The following were the data centers:

- Servicio Geólogico Colombiano (SGC) (Columbian Geological Survey) - Regional Data Center
- Caribbean Institute for Meteorology & Hydrology (CIMH), Barbados - Regional Data Center
- Instituto Nicaragüense de Estudios Territoriales (INETER) - Regional Data Center

== Last publications and workshops ==
The last publications and workshops of COCOnet were the following:

- Geirsson, Halldor; Lafemina, Peter C.; Demets, Charles; Hernandez, Douglas Antonio; Mattioli, Glen S.; Rogers, Robert; Rodriguez, Manuel; Marroquin, Griselda; Tenorio, Virginia (2015). "The 2012 August 27 M _{w}7.3 El Salvador earthquake: Expression of weak coupling on the Middle America subduction zone". Geophysical Journal International. 202 (3): 1677–1689. doi:10.1093/gji/ggv244.
- Douilly, R.; Aochi, H.; Calais, E.; Freed, A. M. (2015). "Three-dimensional dynamic rupture simulations across interacting faults: The M_{w}7.0, 2010, Haiti earthquake" (PDF). Journal of Geophysical Research: Solid Earth. 120 (2): 1108–1128. doi:10.1002/2014JB011595.

The last workshop was COCONet - Results, Sustainability, and Capacity Building, which had been held May 3–5, 2016 in Punta Cana, Dominican Republic.
