= EarthScope =

Earth science program exploring the structure of the North American continent

EarthScope project logo

The EarthScope project (2003-2018) was a National Science Foundation (NSF) funded Earth science program using geological and geophysical techniques to explore the structure and evolution of the North American continent and to understand the processes controlling earthquakes and volcanoes. The project had three components: USArray, the Plate Boundary Observatory, and the San Andreas Fault Observatory at Depth (some of which continued beyond the end of the project). Organizations associated with the project included UNAVCO, the Incorporated Research Institutions for Seismology (IRIS), Stanford University, the United States Geological Survey (USGS) and National Aeronautics and Space Administration (NASA). Several international organizations also contributed to the initiative. EarthScope data are publicly accessible.

== Observatories ==
There were three EarthScope project observatories:

- The San Andreas Fault Observatory at Depth (SAFOD)
- The Plate Boundary Observatory (PBO)
- The Seismic and Magnetotelluric Observatory (USArray)

These observatories consisted of boreholes into an active fault zone, global positioning system (GPS) receivers, tiltmeters, long-baseline laser strainmeters, borehole strainmeters, permanent and portable seismometers, and magnetotelluric stations. The various EarthScope components provided integrated and highly accessible data on geochronology and thermochronology, petrology and geochemistry, structure and tectonics, surficial processes and geomorphology, geodynamic modeling, rock physics, and hydrogeology.

=== Seismic and Magnetotelluric Observatory (USArray) ===
USArray, managed by IRIS, was a 15-year program to place a dense network of permanent and portable seismographs across the continental United States. These seismographs recorded the seismic waves released by earthquakes that occur around the world. Seismic waves are indicators of energy disbursement within the earth. By analyzing the records of earthquakes obtained from this dense grid of seismometers, scientists could learn about Earth structure and dynamics and the physical processes controlling earthquakes and volcanoes. The goal of USArray was primarily to gain a better understanding of the structure and evolution of the continental crust, lithosphere, and mantle underneath North America.

The USArray was composed of four facilities: a Transportable Array, a Flexible Array, a Reference Network, and a Magnetotelluric Facility.

==== Transportable Array ====
The Transportable Array was composed of 400 seismometers that were deployed in a rolling grid across the United States over a period of 10 years. The stations were placed 70 km apart, and could map the upper 70 km of the Earth. After approximately two years, stations were moved east to the next site on the grid – unless adopted by an organization and made a permanent installation. Once the sweep across the United States was completed, over 2000 locations had been occupied. The Array Network Facility was responsible for data collection from the Transportable Array stations.

==== Flexible Array ====
The Flexible Array was composed of 291 broadband stations, 120 short period stations, and 1700 active source stations. The Flexible Array allowed sites to be targeted in a more focused manner than the broad Transportable Array. Natural or artificially created seismic waves could be used to map structures in the Earth.

==== Reference Network ====
The Reference Network was composed of permanent seismic stations spaced about 300 km apart. The Reference Network provided a baseline for the Transportable Array and Flexible Array. EarthScope added and upgraded 39 stations to the already existing Advanced National Seismic System, which was part of the Reference Network.

==== Magnetotelluric Facility ====
The Magnetotelluric Facility was composed of seven permanent and 20 portable sensors that recorded electromagnetic fields. It is the electromagnetic equivalent of the seismic arrays. The portable sensors were moved in a rolling grid similar to the Transportable Array grid, but were only in place about a month before they were moved to the next location. A magnetotelluric station consists of a magnetometer, four electrodes, and a data recording unit that are buried in shallow holes. The electrodes are oriented north-south and east-west and are saturated in a salt solution to improve conductivity with the ground.

An EarthScope GPS Geosensor, a component of the Plate Boundary Observatory (PBO)

=== Plate Boundary Observatory (PBO) ===
The Plate Boundary Observatory PBO consisted of a series of geodetic instruments, Global Positioning System (GPS) receivers and borehole strainmeters, that were installed to help understand the boundary between the North American Plate and Pacific Plate. The PBO network comprised 1100 permanent, continuously operating Global Positioning System (GPS) stations, many providing high-rate, real-time data, together with 78 borehole seismometers, 74 borehole strainmeters, 26 shallow borehole tiltmeters, and six long baseline laser strainmeters. These instruments were complemented by InSAR (interferometric synthetic aperture radar) and LiDAR (light detection and ranging) imagery and geochronology acquired as part of the GeoEarthScope initiative. PBO also included comprehensive data products, data management and education and outreach efforts. These permanent networks were supplemented by a pool of portable GPS receivers that could be deployed for temporary networks to researchers, to measure the crustal motion at a specific target or in response to a geologic event. The Plate Boundary Observatory portion of EarthScope was operated by UNAVCO.

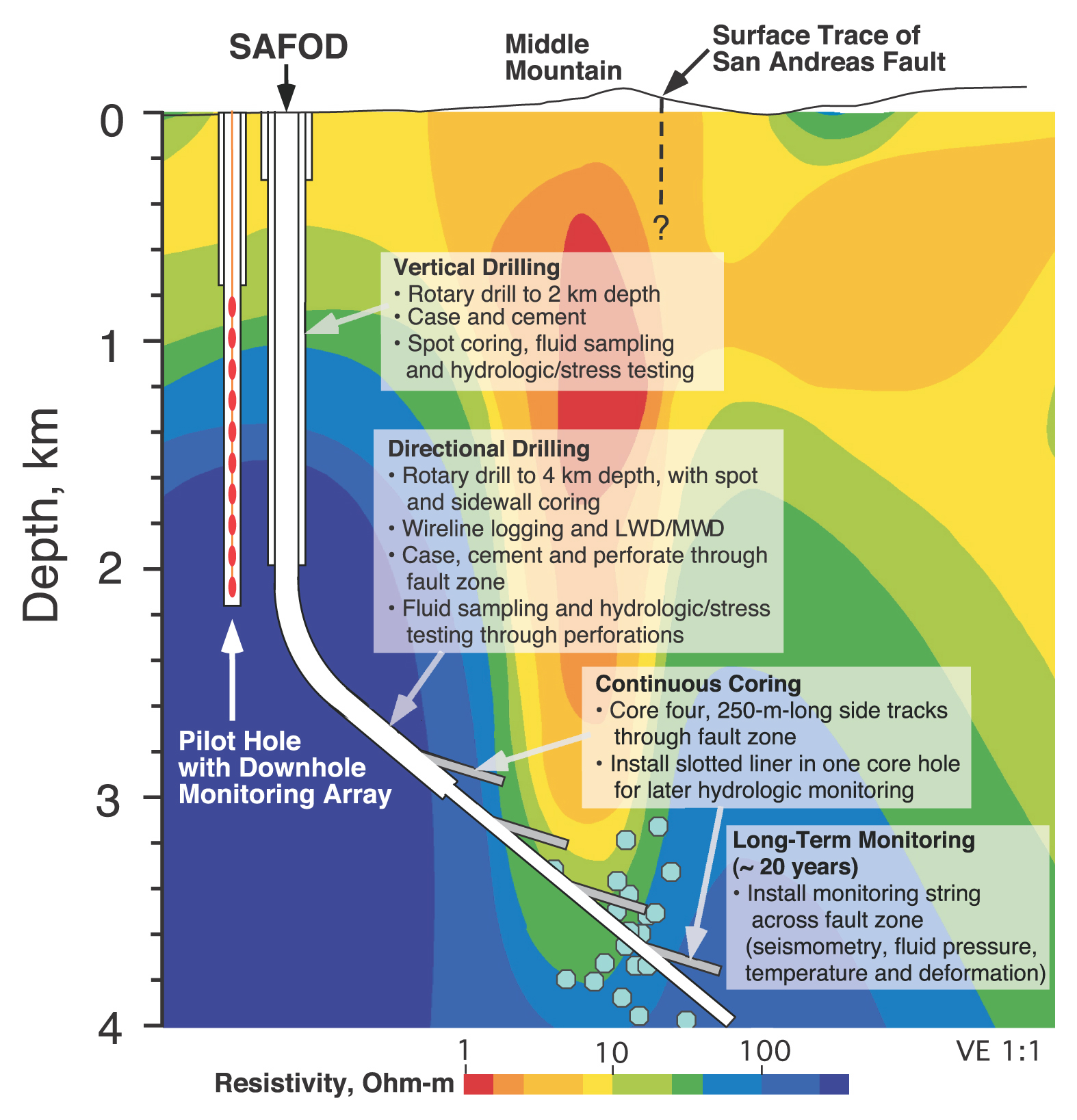
Schematic representation of the SAFOD main borehole and pilot hole

=== San Andreas Fault Observatory at Depth (SAFOD) ===
The San Andreas Fault Observatory at Depth (SAFOD) consisted of a main borehole that cut across the active San Andreas Fault at a depth of approximately 3 km and a pilot hole about 2 km southwest of San Andreas Fault. Data from the instruments installed in the holes, which consisted of geophone sensors, data acquisition systems, and GPS clocks, as well as samples collected during drilling, helped to better understand the processes that control the behavior of the San Andreas Fault.

== Data Products ==
Data collected from the various observatories were used to create different types of data products. Each data product addressed a different scientific problem.

=== P-Wave Tomography ===
Tomography is a method of producing a three-dimensional image of the internal structures of a solid object (such as the human body or the earth) by the observation and recording of differences in the effects on the passage of energy waves impinging on those structures. The waves of energy are P-waves generated by earthquakes and are recording the wave velocities. The high quality data that was collected by the permanent seismic stations of USArray and the Advanced National Seismic System (ANSS) allowed the creation of high resolution seismic imaging of the Earth's interior below the United States. Seismic tomography helps constrain mantle velocity structure and aids in the understanding of chemical and geodynamic processes that are at work. With the use of the data collected by USArray and global travel-time data, a global tomography model of P-wave velocity heterogeneity in the mantle could be created. The range and resolution of this technique allowed investigation into the suite of problems that are of concern in the North American mantle lithosphere, including the nature of the major tectonic features. This method gives evidence for differences in thickness and the velocity anomaly of the mantle lithosphere between the stable center of the continent and the more active western North America. These data are vital for the understanding of local lithosphere evolution, and when combined with additional global data, allow the mantle to be imaged beyond the current extent of USArray.

=== Receiver Reference Models ===
EarthScope Automated Receiver Survey (EARS), created a prototype of a system that was used to address several key elements of the production of EarthScope products. One of the prototype systems was the receiver reference model. It provided crustal thickness and average crustal Vp/Vs ratios beneath USArray transportable array stations.

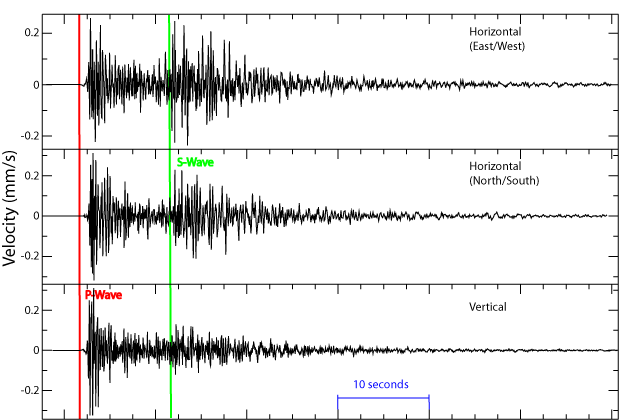
P-waves and S-waves from a seismograph

=== Ambient Seismic Noise ===
The main function of the Advanced National Seismic System (ANSS) and USArray, was to provide high quality data for earthquake monitoring, source studies and Earth structure research. The utility of seismic data is greatly increased when noise levels, unwanted vibrations, are reduced; however broadband seismograms will always contain a certain level of noise. The dominant sources of noise are either from the instrumentation itself or from ambient Earth vibrations. Normally, seismometer self noise will be well below the seismic noise level, and every station will have a characteristic noise pattern that can be calculated or observed. Seismic noise within the Earth arises from human activity at or near the surface, wind-driven objects transferring motion to the ground, running water (river flow), surf, volcanic activity, and long-period tilt caused by thermal instabilities from poor station design.

A new approach to seismic noise studies was introduced with the EarthScope project, in that there were no attempts to screen the continuous waveforms to eliminate body and surface waves from the naturally occurring earthquakes. Earthquake signals are not generally included in the processing of noise data, because they are generally low probability occurrences, even at low power levels. Seismic noise data were gathered to provide and document a standard method for calculating ambient seismic background noise, and to characterize variations in ambient background noise levels across the United States by geography, season, and time of day. The new statistical approach provided the ability to compute probability density functions (PDFs) to evaluate the full range of noise at a given seismic station, allowing the estimation of noise levels over a broad range of frequencies from 0.01–16 Hz (100-0.0625s period). With the use of this new method it became much easier to compare seismic noise characteristics between different networks in different regions.

=== Earthquake Ground Motion Animations ===
Seismometers of USArray transportable array recorded the passage of numerous seismic waves through a given point near the Earth's surface, and classically these seismograms are analyzed to deduce properties of the Earth's structure and the seismic source. Given a spatially dense set of seismic recordings, these signals could also be used to visualize the actual continuous seismic waves, providing new insights and interpretation techniques into complex wave propagation effects. Using signals recorded by the array of seismometers, the EarthScope project animated seismic waves as they sweep across the USArray transportable array for selected larger earthquakes. This illustrated the regional and teleseismic wave propagation phenomena. The seismic data collected from both permanent and transportable seismic stations was used to provide these computer generated animations.

=== Regional Moment Tensors ===
The seismic moment tensor is one of the fundamental parameters of earthquakes that can be determined from seismic observations. It is directly related to earthquake fault orientation and rupture direction. The moment magnitude, Mw derived from the moment tensor magnitude, is the most reliable quantity for comparing and measuring the size of an earthquake with other earthquake magnitudes. Moment tensors are used in a wide range of seismological research fields, such as earthquake statistics, earthquake scaling relationships, and stress inversion. The creation of regional moment tensor solutions, with the appropriate software, for moderate-to-large earthquakes in the U.S. came from USArray transportable array and Advance National Seismic System broadband seismic stations. Results were obtained in the time and the frequency domain. Waveform fit and amplitude-phase match figures were provided to allow users to evaluate moment tensor quality.

=== Geodetic Monitoring of the Western US and Hawaii ===
Global Positioning System (GPS) equipment and techniques provide a unique opportunity for earth scientists to study regional and local tectonic plate motions and conduct natural hazards monitoring. Cleaned network solutions from several GPS arrays merged into regional clusters in conjunction with the EarthScope project. The arrays included the Pacific Northwest Geodetic Array, EarthScope's Plate Boundary Observatory, the Western Canadian Deformation Array, and networks run by the US Geological Survey. The daily GPS measurements from ~1500 stations along the Pacific/North American plate boundary provided millimeter-scale accuracy and could be used monitor the displacements of the earths crust. With the use of data modeling software and the recorded GPS data, the opportunity to quantify crustal deformation caused by plate tectonics, earthquakes, landslides and volcanic eruptions was possible.

=== Time-dependent Strain ===
The goal was to provide models of time-dependent strain associated with a number of recent earthquakes and other geologic events as constrained by GPS data. With the use of InSAR (Interferometric Synthetic Aperture Radar), a remote-sensing technique, and PBO (Plate Boundary Observatory), a fixed array of GPS receivers and strainmeters, the EarthScope project provided spatially continuous strain measurements over wide geographic areas with decimeter to centimeter resolution.

=== Global Strain Rate Map ===
The Global Strain Rate Map (GSRM) is a project of the International Lithosphere Program whose mission is to determine a globally self-consistent strain rate and velocity field model, consistent with geodetic and geologic field observations collected by GPS, seismometers, and strainometers. GSRM is a digital model of the global velocity gradient tensor field associated with the accommodation of present-day crustal motions. The overall mission also includes: (1) contributions of global, regional, and local models by individual researchers; (2) archive existing data sets of geologic, geodetic, and seismic information that can contribute toward a greater understanding of strain phenomena; and (3) archive existing methods for modeling strain rates and strain transients. A completed global strain rate map provided a large amount of information which will contribute to the understanding of continental dynamics and for the quantification of seismic hazards.

== Science ==
There were seven topics the EarthScope program addressed with the use of the observatories.

=== Convergent Margin Processes ===
Oceanic-Continental convergent margin

Convergent margins, also known as convergent boundaries, are active regions of deformation between two or more tectonic plates colliding with one another. Convergent margins create areas of tectonic uplift, such as mountain ranges or volcanoes. EarthScope focused on the boundary between the Pacific Plate and the North American Plate in the western United States. EarthScope provided GPS geodetic data, seismic images, detailed seismicity, magnetotelluric data, InSAR, stress field maps, digital elevation models, baseline geology, and paleoseismology for a better understanding of convergent margin processes.

A few questions EarthScope addressed include:

- What controls the lithospheric architecture?
- What controls the locus of volcanism?
- How do convergent margin processes contribute to growth of the continent through time?

=== Crustal Strain and Deformation ===
Crustal strain and deformation is the change in shape and volume of continental and oceanic crust caused by stress applied to rock through tectonic forces. An array of variables including composition, temperature, pressure, etc., determines how the crust will deform.

A few questions EarthScope addressed include:

- How do crust and mantle rheology vary with rock type and with depth?
- How does lithospheric rheology change in the vicinity of a fault zone?
- What is the distribution of stress in the lithosphere?

=== Continental Deformation ===
Continental deformation is driven by plate interactions through active tectonic processes such as continental transform systems with extensional, strike-slip, and contractional regimes. EarthScope provided velocity field data, portable and continuous GPS data, fault-zone drilling and sampling, reflection seismology, modern seismicity, pre-Holocene seismicity, and magnetotelluric and potential field data for a better understanding of continental deformation.

A few questions EarthScope addressed include:

- What are the fundamental controls on deformation of the continent?
- What is the strength profile(s) of the lithosphere?
- What defines tectonic regimes within the continent?

=== Continent Structure and Evolution ===
Earth's continents are compositionally distinct from the oceanic crust. The continents record four billion years of geologic history, while the oceanic crust gets recycled about every 180 million years. Because of the age of continental crusts, the ancient structural evolution of the continents can be studied. Data from EarthScope was used to find the mean seismic structure of the continental crust, associated mantle, and crust-mantle transition. Variability in that structure was also studied. EarthScope attempted to define continental lithosphere formation and continent structure and to identify the relationship between continental structure and deformation.

A few questions EarthScope addressed include:

- How does magmatism modify, enlarge, and deform continental lithosphere?
- How are the crust and lithospheric mantle related?
- What is the role of extension, orogenic collapse, and rifting in constructing the continents?

=== Faults and Earthquake Processes ===
EarthScope acquired 3D and 4D data that gave scientists a more detailed insight into faulting and earthquakes. This project provided a data upgrade from work done in previous years. New data enabled an improved study and understanding of faults and earthquakes that increased our knowledge of the complete earthquake process, allowing for the continued development of building predictive models. Detailed information on internal fault zone architecture, crust and upper mantle structure, strain rates, and transitions between fault systems and deformation types; as well as heat flow, electromagnetic/magnetotelluric, and seismic waveform data, were all made available.

A few questions EarthScope addressed include:

- How does strain accumulate and release at plate boundaries and within the North American plate?
- How do earthquakes start, rupture, and stop?
- What is the absolute strength of faults and the surrounding lithosphere?

The structure of the Earth

=== Deep Earth Structure ===
Through the use of seismology, scientists were able to collect and evaluate data from the deepest parts of our planet, from the continental lithosphere down to the core. The relationship between lithospheric and the upper mantle processes is something that is not completely known, including upper mantle processes below the United States and their effects on the continental lithosphere. There are many issues of interest, such as determining the source of forces originating in the upper mantle and their effects on the continental lithosphere. Seismic data gave scientists more understanding and insight into the lower mantle and the Earth's core, as well as activity at the core-mantle boundary.

A few questions hoping to be answered by EarthScope included:

- How is evolution of the continents linked to processes in the upper mantle?
- What is the level of heterogeneity in the mid-mantle?
- What is the nature and heterogeneity of the lower mantle and core-mantle boundary?

=== Fluids and Magmas ===
EarthScope hoped to provide a better understanding of the physics of fluids and magmas in active volcanic systems in relation to the deep Earth and how the evolution of continental lithosphere is related to upper mantle processes. The basic idea of how the various melts are formed is known, but not the volumes and rates of magma production outside of Mid-ocean ridge basalts. EarthScope provided seismic data and tomographic images of the mantle to better understand these processes.

A few questions EarthScope addressed include:

- Over what temporal and spatial scales do earthquake deformation and volcanic eruptions couple?
- What controls eruption style?
- What are the predictive signs of imminent volcanic eruption? What are the structural, rheological, and chemical controls on fluid flow in the crust?

== Education and Outreach ==
The Education and Outreach Program was designed to integrate EarthScope into both the classroom and the community. The program reached out to scientific educators and students as well as industry professionals (engineers, land/resource managers, technical application/data users), partners of the project (UNAVCO, IRIS, USGS, NASA, etc.), and the general public. To accomplish this, the EOP offered a wide array of educational workshops and seminars, directed at various audiences, to offer support on data interpretation and implementation of data products into the classroom. Their job was to make sure that everyone understood what EarthScope was, what it was doing in the community, and how to use the data it was producing. By generating new research opportunities for students in the scientific community, the program also hoped to expand recruitment for future generations of earth scientists.

=== Mission ===
"To use EarthScope data, products, and results to create a measurable and lasting change on the way that Earth science is taught and perceived in the United States."

=== Goals ===
- Create a high-profile public identity for EarthScope that emphasizes the integrated nature of the scientific discoveries and the importance of EarthScope research initiatives.
- Establish a sense of ownership among scientific, professional, and educational communities and the public so that a diverse group of individuals and organizations can and will make contributions to EarthScope.
- Promote science literacy and understanding of EarthScope among all audiences through informal education venues.
- Advance formal Earth science education by promoting inquiry-based classroom investigations that focus on understanding Earth and the interdisciplinary nature of EarthScope.
- Encourage use of EarthScope data, discoveries, and new technology in resolving challenging problems and improving our quality of life.

=== EarthScope In the Classroom ===
Education and outreach developed tools for educators and students across the United States to interpret and apply this information for solving a wide range of scientific issues within the earth sciences. The project tailored its products to the specified needs and requests of educators.

==== K-12 Education ====
The EarthScope Education and Outreach Bulletin was a bulletin targeted for grades 5-8 that summarized a volcanic or tectonic event documented by EarthScope into an easily interpretable format, complete with diagrams and 3D models. The EarthScope Voyager, Jr. allowed students to explore and visualize the various types of data that were collected through various types of base maps, features, and plate velocities. Educators could access to real time GPS data of plate movement and influences through the UNAVCO website.

==== University Level ====
EarthScope promised to produce a large amount of geological and geophysical data to the door for numerous research opportunities in the scientific community. As the USArray Big Foot project moved across the country, universities adopted seismic stations near their areas monitored by both professors and students. A list of funded proposals can be found on the NSF website.

== Legacy ==
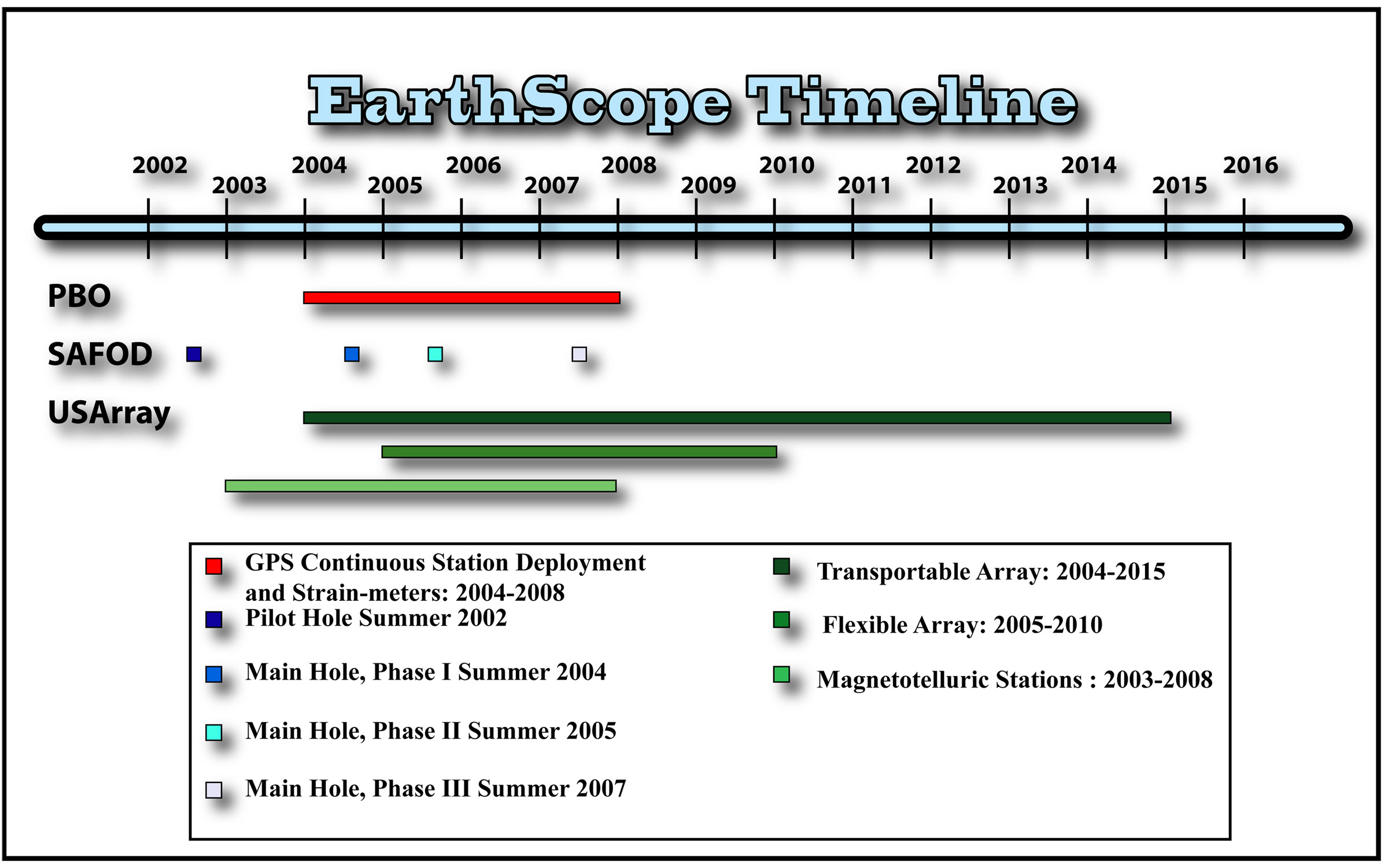

Many applications for EarthScope data currently exist, as mentioned above. The EarthScope program was dedicated to determining the three dimensional structure of the North American continent. Future uses of the data that it produced might include hydrocarbon exploration, aquifer boundary establishment, remote sensing technique development, and earthquake risk assessment. Due to the open and free-to-the-public data portals that EarthScope and its partners maintain, the applications are limited only by the creativity of those who wish to sort through the gigabytes of data.

=== EarthScope Consortium ===
Given that IRIS and UNAVCO operated the seismology and geodesy components of the instrumentation that the project relied on, when these two organizations merged in 2023 they adopted the name EarthScope Consortium to represent the shared vision of the new organization.

== See also ==
- German Continental Deep Drilling Programme (KTB)
- Kola Superdeep Borehole
- San Andreas Fault Observatory at Depth (SAFOD project)
