= Polar Earth Observing Network (POLENET) =

GPS network

The Polar Earth Observing Network (POLENET) is a global network involving researchers from 24 nations for the geophysical observation of the polar regions of our planet.

POLENET focuses mainly on data collection of GPS and seismic sensors, by means of autonomous systems. Its research includes geophysical observations such as changes in magnetic fields as well as tide gauge and gravity measurements. It also makes use of deep-sea multi-sensor observatories as well as space and airborne remote sensing. Data is collected from equipment spanning much of the Antarctic and the Greenland ice sheets, as well as the Arctic regions of Finland, Sweden, Norway, and Russia.

POLENET is able to assemble research from a consortium of Antarctic Network (ANET), Greenland Network (G-NET), Gamburtsev Antarctic Mountains Seismic Experiment (GAMSEIS), Lapland Network (LAP-NET), and Long-Term Network.

== Long-term networks ==
Antarctic Treaty nations are presently collecting seismic and geodetic measurements at their permanent research stations. Arctic Circle nations are doing the same. With this, long-term data sets assist in POLENET science objectives. This assists in allowing to densify measurements in many sectors of the continental-scale POLENET networks.

Flag of the Antarctic Treaty System

Map of the Arctic Circle

== The Antarctic networks ==
The Antarctic networks are following:

- Antarctic Network (ANET)
- Gamburtsev Antarctic Mountains Seismic Experiment (GAMSEIS)

== Antarctic Network (ANET) ==
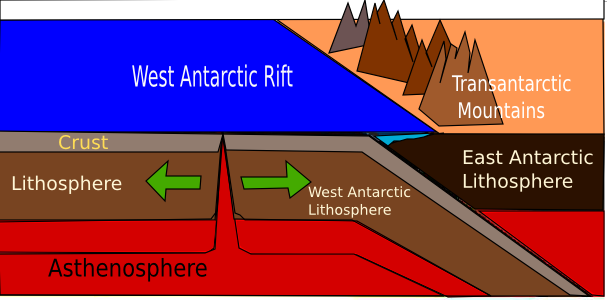
West Antarctic Rift and the Transantarctic Mountains

ANET is a GPS and seismic network that spans the area of West Antarctica and the Transantarctic Mountains (the mountain range that separates East Antarctica from West Antarctica). as well as the perimeter of East Antarctica, allowing refinement of estimates of recent ice mass change of the Antarctic ice sheets. The GPS component is able to assess the rise of land as ice sheets melt, reducing pressure from the mass of the ice sheets. This adjustment in land elevation is Glacial Isostatic Adjustment (GIA).

ANET is assisting in the following:

- A better understanding of complex Glacial Isostatic Adjustment processes in Antarctica
- The building of well-constrained 3-D models
- The calibration of our planet's mantle viscosities
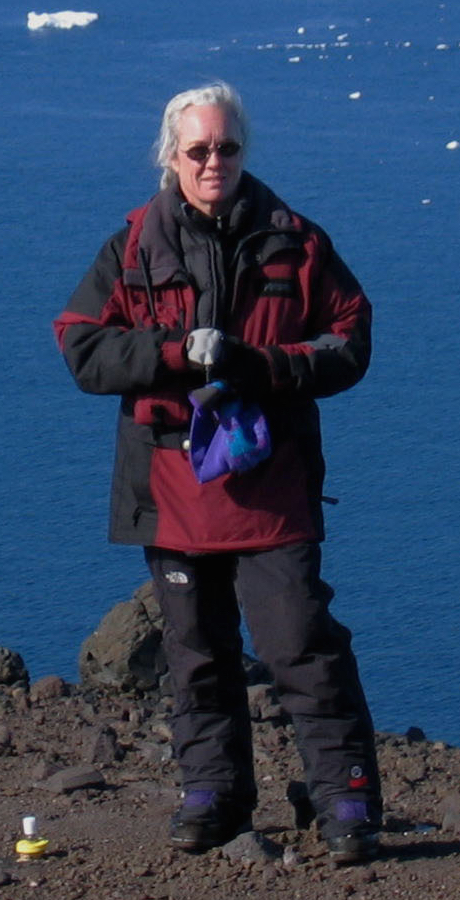
  Dr. Terry Wilson, OSU Professor, Head of ANET, and AGU award winner in 2023

=== Backbone network ===
ANET has the uniqueness of having a backbone network consists of both GPS and seismic instrumentation.

=== GPS stations ===
The GPS stations record movement of bedrock (solid rock under loose surface material) as changes in ice mass take place. As the bedrock deforms under the pressure of the ice sheets, it is affected by the strength of the Earth's interior.

=== Seismic stations ===
Seismic stations record data that allows researchers to analyze seismic data to help understand the geological issues taking place as changes in the ice sheets take place, including the strength of our planet's crust and underlying mantle.

The project is led by the Byrd Polar Research Center at Ohio State University (OSU). in 2023, OSU Professor and head of ANET Terry Wilson was awarded the Ivan I. Mueller Award for Distinguished Service and Leadership by the American Geophysical Union (AGU). She was a pioneer in using GPS to measure bedrock motion in the Antarctica continent and was instrumental in the deployment of the first continental-scale network of remote, autonomous GNSS and seismic instruments.

The collaborators on the project include scientists at NASA's Jet Propulsion Laboratory, New Mexico Tech, Penn State, University of Memphis, University of Texas Institute for Geophysics, and Washington University. ANET was initially deployed beginning in 2007-08 during the International Polar Year activities.

== Gamburtsev Antarctic Mountains Seismic Experiment (GAMSEIS) ==
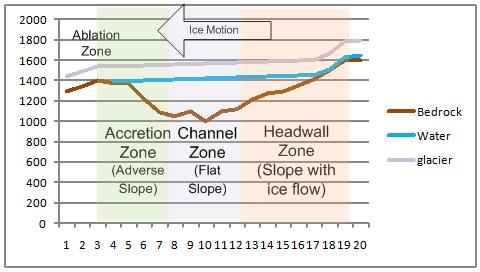
An example of glacial motion in the Gamburtsev Subglacial Mountains in Antarctica.

GAMSEIS deploys broadband seismometers to image the structure of the Gamburtsev Subglacial Mountains (GSM) of East Antarctica.

The GSM are located on the highest plateau of the continent, which is about 4000 m above sea level.

GAMSEIS seismic data has been able to provide information on the following:

- The lithospheric structure and elevation mechanism of the GSM
- The formation process of the Gondwana supercontinent
- The bedrock topography and geological structure underneath the ice sheet

The seismic images from the GSM may assist in the understanding into what is causing the upward movement or elevation mechanism of the mountains, as well as the understanding of how this upward motion has shaped the formation of the East Antarctic Ice Sheet. The integrated network will provide synoptic measurements across the interior of West Antarctica, as well as much of the perimeter of East Antarctica, allowing refinement of estimates of recent ice mass change of the Antarctic ice sheets. We are measuring the steady vertical velocity field due to isostatic rebound with GPS and will constrain earth rheology (elasticity, viscosity) through seismic studies. It is led by Pennsylvania State University and Washington University in St. Louis.

== Arctic Circle networks ==
The following are the networks in the Arctic Circle:

- Greenland Network (G-NET)
- Lapland Network (LAP-NET)

== Greenland Network (G-NET) ==
Greenland

G-NET is a network of 46 continuous GPS stations spread across Greenland, an autonomous territory of the Kingdom of Denmark. As ice sheets there melt, the system maps the steady vertical velocity field associated with the rise of land masses after the ice sheets melt (post-glacial rebound). It is also composed of 60 GNSS (Global Satellite Navigation System) for geodetic research and is considered the fundamental geodetic infrastructure in Greenland.

In 2019, a memorandum of understanding was signed by the NSF and the Danish Agency for Data Supply and Efficiency (SDFE) for the transfer of ownership and maintenance responsibility for G-NET to the Danish government and SDFE.

G-NET is maintained and developed in close cooperation with the following:

- Danish Agency for Data Supply and Infrastructure (SDFI)
- Technical University of Denmark
- The Department of Geodesy of the Danish Space Research Institute (DTU Space)
- National Science Foundation (NSF)

Like ANET, there is research that is also led by Ohio State University.

== Lapland network (LAP-NET) ==
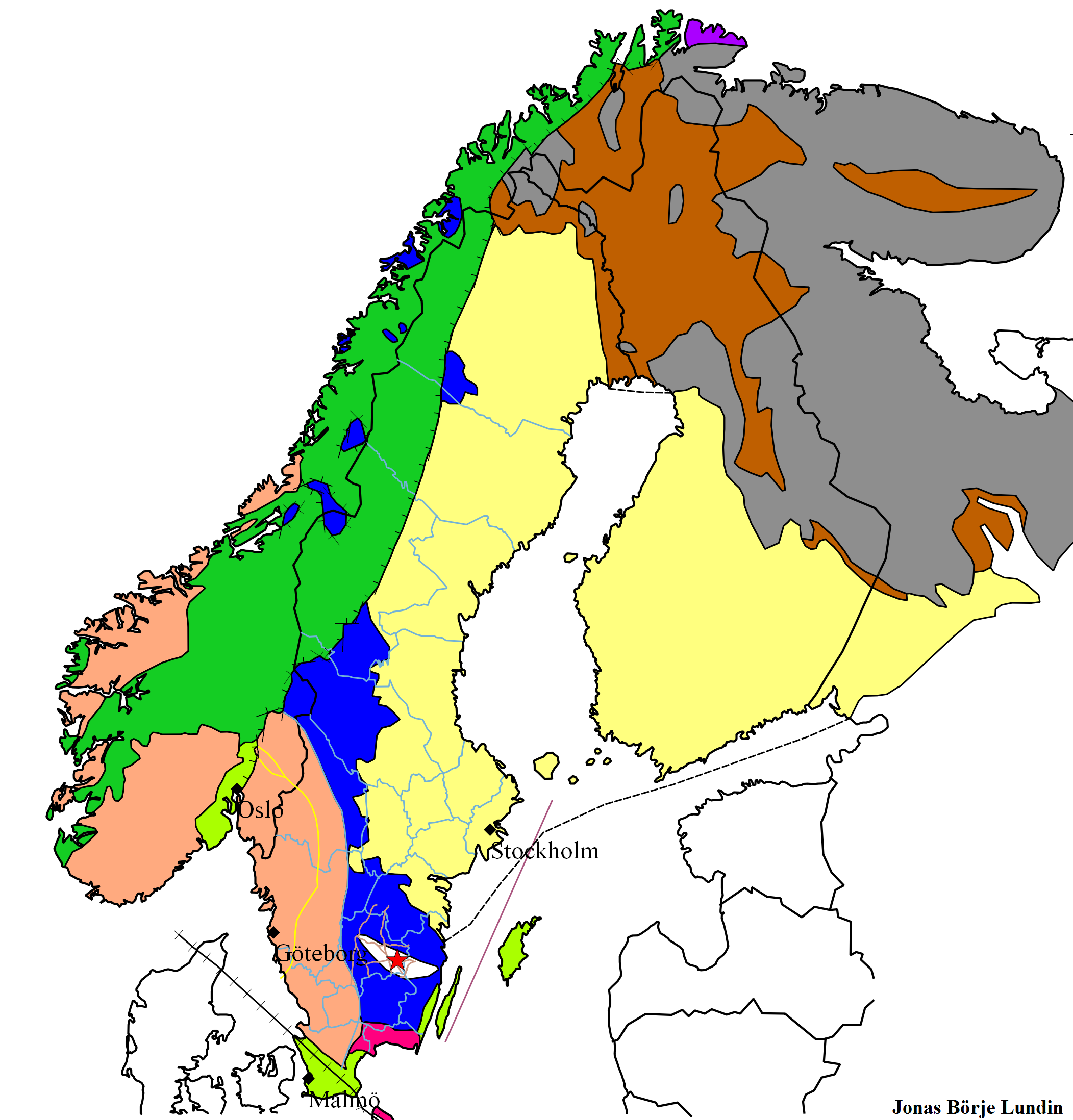
Map of the geological units of Fennoscandia

LAPNET is a network of 60 seismic stations across the Arctic regions of Finland, Sweden, Norway, and Russia.

It was deployed during the third International Polar Year (IPY) of 2007–2009. The project collects data of seismic waves travelling through our planet as well as instances of glacial earthquakes (seismic activity from glacial movement).

Outside of natural seismic events, LAP-NET has been able to detect seismic waves from quarry blasts from local mining operations, which has supplied geological information about local, subsurface structures. The research goal is to create a 3D seismic model of the crust and upper mantle down to 670 km in northern Baltic Shield (Fennoscandian Shield).

The seismic data will be compiled into a database for the global geophysical community. It is led by the University of Oulu in Finland.
