= TLALOCNet =

GPS network

TLALOCNet is network of GPS and meteorological stations in Mexico.

The Trans-boundary, Land, and Atmosphere Long-term Observational and Collaborative Network (TLALOCNet) is a network of continuous Global Positioning System (GPS) and meteorology stations in Mexico to study atmospheric and solid earth processes. This completed network spans most of Mexico with a strong coverage emphasis on southern and western Mexico. The network created a collection of continuous GPS meteorology or cGPS/Met sites based on the EarthScope Plate Boundary Observatory standards for the study of atmospheric and geological processes.

The network's name is play with the name of an Aztec deity, Tlaloc, the god of rain. Discharge rain, hail and lightning over the earth were associated with this character in ancient Mexico. As the network has pointed in a presentation concerning the capabilities of scientific measurements and forecasts for rain, hail, and hail:

Now, these elements are expected to be observed through the GPS network that is part of the "Long-Term Terrestrial and Atmospheric Transboundary Observatory and Collaboration Network".

== Funding organizations ==
The network was funded by the following:

- The U.S. National Science Foundation (NSF)
- The Consejo Nacional de Humanidades, Ciencias y Tecnologías (CONACyT), which is the Mexican equivalent of the NSF. The English translation of CONACyT is the National Council of Humanities, Sciences, and Technologies.
- The National Autonomous University of Mexico (UNAM)

== Geophysics explored ==
The network is capable of analysis of the geophysics in the:

- Mexican subduction zone
- The Gulf of California fault system

== Collaborations ==
TLALOCnet works with Mexico's National Seismological Service (Servicio Sismológico Nacional, SSN), which is part of the Geophysics Institute at the National Autonomous University of Mexico (UNAM), to provide the GPS data for the country's National Space Weather Laboratory (Laboratorio Nacional de Clima Espacial, LANCE) for the creation of the Total Electron Content maps near to real time (AzTEC). TEC maps can be used in real time to estimate the effect of the ionospheric electron content between a receiver and a GPS satellite on GPS signal delay.
