= Plate Boundary Observatory =

The Plate Boundary Observatory (PBO) was the geodetic component of the EarthScope Facility. EarthScope was an Earth science program that explored the 4-dimensional structure of the North American Continent. EarthScope (and PBO) was a 15-year project (2003-2018) funded by the National Science Foundation (NSF) in conjunction with NASA. PBO construction (an NSF MREFC) took place from October 2003 through September 2008. Phase 1 of operations and maintenance concluded in September 2013. Phase 2 of operations ended in September 2018, along with the end of the EarthScope project. In October 2018, PBO was assimilated into a broader Network of the Americas (NOTA), along with networks in Mexico (TLALOCNet) and the Caribbean (COCONet), as part of the NSF's Geodetic Facility for the Advancement of Geosciences (GAGE). GAGE is operated by EarthScope Consortium.

PBO precisely measured Earth deformation resulting from the constant motion of the Pacific and North American tectonic plates in the western United States. These Earth movements can be very small and incremental and not felt by people, or they can be very large and sudden, such as those that occur during earthquakes and volcanic eruptions. The high-precision instrumentation of the PBO enabled detection of motions to a sub-centimeter level. PBO measured Earth deformation through a network of instrumentation including: high precision Global Positioning System (GPS) and Global Navigation Satellite System (GNSS) receivers, strainmeters, seismometers, tiltmeters, and other geodetic instruments.

The PBO GPS network included 1100 stations extending from the Aleutian Islands south to Baja and eastward across the continental United States. During the construction phase, 891 permanent and continuously operating GPS stations were installed, and another 209 existing stations were integrated (PBO Nucleus stations) into the network. Geodetic imaging data was transmitted, often in realtime, from a wide network of GPS stations, augmented by seismometers, strainmeters and tiltmeters, complemented by InSAR (interferometric synthetic aperture radar), LiDAR (light-activated radar), and geochronology.

The GPS stations were categorized into clusters. The transform cluster was near the San Andreas Fault in California; the subduction cluster was in the Cascadia subduction zone (northern California, Oregon, Washington, and southern British Columbia); the extension cluster was in the Basin and Range region; the volcanic cluster was in the Yellowstone caldera, the Long Valley caldera, and the Cascade Volcanoes; the backbone cluster was at 100–200 km intervals across the United States to provide complete spatial coverage.

An EarthScope GPS sensor, a component of the Plate Boundary Observatory (PBO) system.

Data from the PBO was, and NOTA data continue to be, transmitted to the GAGE Facility, operated by EarthScope Consortium, to the data center where it is collected, archived and distributed. These data sets continue to be freely and openly available to the public, with equal access provided for all users. PBO data includes the raw data collected from each instrument, quality-checked data in formats commonly used by PBO's various user communities, and processed data such as calibrated time series, velocity fields, and error estimates.

Some scientific questions that addressed by the EarthScope project and the PBO data include:

- How does accumulated strain lead to earthquakes?
- Are there recognizable precursors to earthquakes?
- How does the evolution of the continent influence the motions that are happening today?
- What happens to geologic structures at depth?
- What influences the location of features such as faults and mountain ranges?
- Is it inherited from earlier tectonic events or related to deeper processes in the mantle?
- How is magma generated? How does it travel from the mantle to reach the surface?
- What are the precursors to a volcanic eruption?
