= Seismological Facility for the Advancement of Geoscience =

The U.S. National Science Foundation's Seismological Facility for the Advancement of Geoscience (NSF SAGE) is a distributed, multi-user national facility that provides support for state of-the-art seismic research. It is operated by EarthScope Consortium. Its previous operator was the Incorporated Research Institutions for Seismology (IRIS), until its merger with UNAVCO to become EarthScope Consortium. NSF SAGE is one of the two premier geophysical facilities in support of geoscience and geoscience education of the National Science Foundation. The other premiere geophysical facility is NSF GAGE, the Geodetic Facility for the Advancement of Geoscience.

The services of the facility include support for the Global Seismographic Network (GSN), Data Services, and instrument support via the EarthScope Primary Instrument Center (EPIC), including magnetotelluric (MT) geophysical research.

== Global Seismographic Network (GSN) ==
NSF SAGE manages 40 stations of the 152-station Global Seismographic Network (GSN) for basic global seismicity and Earth structure research.

The GSN also enables earthquake hazard mission-related data operations such as:

- Earthquake location and characterization
- Tsunami warning
- Nuclear explosion monitoring

== Data Services ==
SAGE Data Services (DS) is the largest facility for the archiving, curation, and distribution of seismological and other geophysical data in the world.

== EarthScope Primary Instrument Center (EPIC) ==
The EPIC facility maintains the largest open access, shared-use pool of portable seismic sensors in the world. It is located on the campus of New Mexico Tech.

== MT ==
NSF SAGE provides instruments for magnetotelluric (MT) or electromagnetic geophysical research for the recording of our planet's ambient electric and magnetic fields, which allow for the characterization of the conductivity of the area consisting of the shallow crust to upper mantle. This helps with analysis of results obtained from seismic imaging methodologies.

The NSF SAGE facility is:

- Developing open source MT data formatting and processing software.
- Providing access to proprietary software products.
