= IRIS Consortium =

Former research group using seismographic data

Incorporated Research Institutions for Seismology
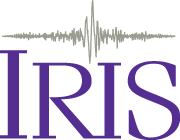
- Founded: October 1984; 42 years ago
- Type: 501(c)(3)
- Location(s): William T. Golden Center for Science and Engineering; Washington, D.C.
- Services: Research, education
- Members: 290 (2018)
- Official languages: English
- Key people: Robert Woodward, President; Richard C. Aster, Chair of the Board of Directors
- Website: www.iris.edu

IRIS (Incorporated Research Institutions for Seismology) was a university research consortium dedicated to exploring the Earth's interior through the collection and distribution of seismographic data. It operated the U.S. National Science Foundation's Seismological Facility for the Advancement of Geoscience (SAGE Facility) until 2023. IRIS programs contributed to scholarly research, education, earthquake hazard mitigation, and the verification of a Comprehensive Nuclear-Test-Ban Treaty. Support for IRIS came from the National Science Foundation, other federal agencies, universities, and private foundations. IRIS supported five major components:

- The Data Management Center (DMC)
- The Portable Array Seismic Studies of the Continental Lithosphere (PASSCAL)
- The Global Seismographic Network (GSN)
- The Transportable Array (USARRAY)
- Education and Public Outreach Program (EPO)

IRIS maintained a corporate office in Washington, D.C.

IRIS's Education and Public Outreach Program offered animations, videos, lessons, software, posters, and fact sheets to help teachers and the general public learn more about seismology and earth science and understand it better. The goal is to get more people interested in careers in geophysics.

IRIS is listed in the Registry of Research Data Repositories re3data.org.

On January 1, 2023, IRIS merged with UNAVCO to form the EarthScope Consortium that now operates both the U.S. National Science Foundation's SAGE and GAGE Facilities through 2025.

== History ==
In 1959, the United States Government launched a research effort aimed at improving national capabilities to detect and identify foreign nuclear explosions detonated underground and at high altitudes. The resultant World-Wide Standardized Seismograph Network (WWSSN) was a program successful beyond its original remit. It provided seismological data for its intended purpose as well as for the emerging concept of plate tectonics. Initially operated by the Defense Department, by 1973 operations were transferred to the United States Geological Survey (USGS). A collaboration with the IRIS Consortium began in 1984 as a result of a need to expand and succeed the WWSSN with the Global Seismographic Network (GSN). The GSN, originally funded entirely by the USGS under the National Earthquake Hazards Reduction Program (NEHRP), is now jointly supported by the National Science Foundation.

== See also ==
- EarthScope
- Geophysics
- POLARIS
- Reflection seismology
- Seismology
- Seismometer
- UNAVCO
- Volcanology
