= David Phillips =

David Phillips may refer to:

== Arts and entertainment ==
- David Graham Phillips (1867–1911), American writer
- David Phillips (cinematographer) (c.1956–2017), American cinematographer
- David Phillips (actor) (born 1978), Canadian actor and host
- David Phillips (screenwriter) (born 1978), American author and screenwriter of Sahara
- David Phillips (CSI), a fictional character in the American crime drama CSI: Crime Scene Investigation
- David Phillips (sculptor) (born 1944), American sculptor

== Science ==
- David Chilton Phillips (1924–1999), British biologist
- David Phillips (chemist) (born 1939), British photochemist, President of the Royal Society of Chemistry and science broadcaster
- David Phillips (climatologist) (born 1944), Environment Canada climatologist
- David Phillips (geologist), Geologist
- David Phillips (sociologist), sociologist who coined the term "Werther effect"

== Sports ==
- David Phillips (footballer) (born 1963), Wales international footballer
- David Phillips (soccer) (born 1966), Canadian international soccer player
- David Phillips (gymnast) (born 1977), New Zealand gymnast
- Dave Phillips (ice hockey) (born 1987), British ice hockey player

== Other ==
- David Atlee Phillips (1922–1988), CIA agent
- David L. Phillips (born 1938), Massachusetts politician
- David Wendell Phillips (born 1962), technology lawyer and angel investor
- David Phillips (police officer) (born 1944), British police officer
- David K. Phillips, American philosopher
- David Phillips (entrepreneur) (born 1964), American civil engineer best known for acquiring 1,253,000 frequent flyer miles by purchasing thousands of cups of pudding

== See also ==
- Dave Phillips (disambiguation)
