= Ken Hon =

American geologist and head of Alaska Volcano Observatory

Ken Hon Ph.D.
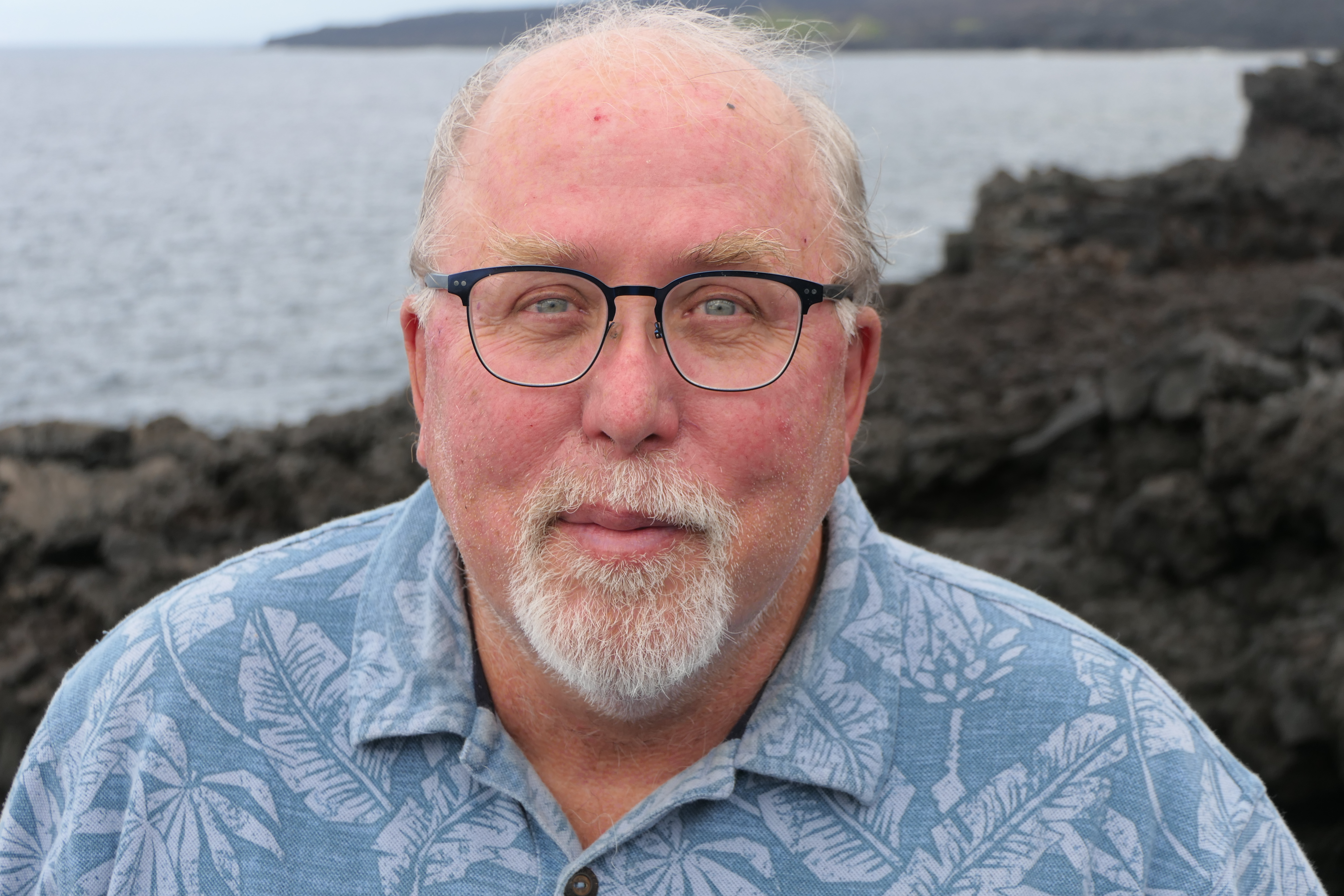
- Ken Hon pictured c. 2011
- Title: Scientist-in-Charge (HVO)

Academic background
- Education: University of Colorado Boulder (BS, PhD)
- Website: www.usgs.gov/staff-profiles/ken-hon

Kenneth Hon, usually known professionally as Ken Hon, is a geologist and the 21st Scientist-in-Charge (SIC) of the Hawaiian Volcano Observatory (HVO), serving since 2021; succeeding Tina Neal (SIC) and David Phillips (Interim SIC). Hon has often been a contact from the Observatory to the news media, and as such is often quoted as an authority figure in the field of Hawaiian volcanology.

== Career ==
As well as his work at HVO, Hon has been a professor at UH Hilo. He also served as the Interim Vice Chancellor for Academic Affairs at Hilo, and eventually became the full Vice Chancellor of Academic Affairs. Also at Hilo, he served as chair of the Geology Department.

Hon was serving as the SIC during the 2022 eruption of Mauna Loa, during which time he was widely quoted in the news as he made statements from the Observatory to the press.
