= James P. Kauahikaua =

American geologist (1951–2023)

James Kauahikaua
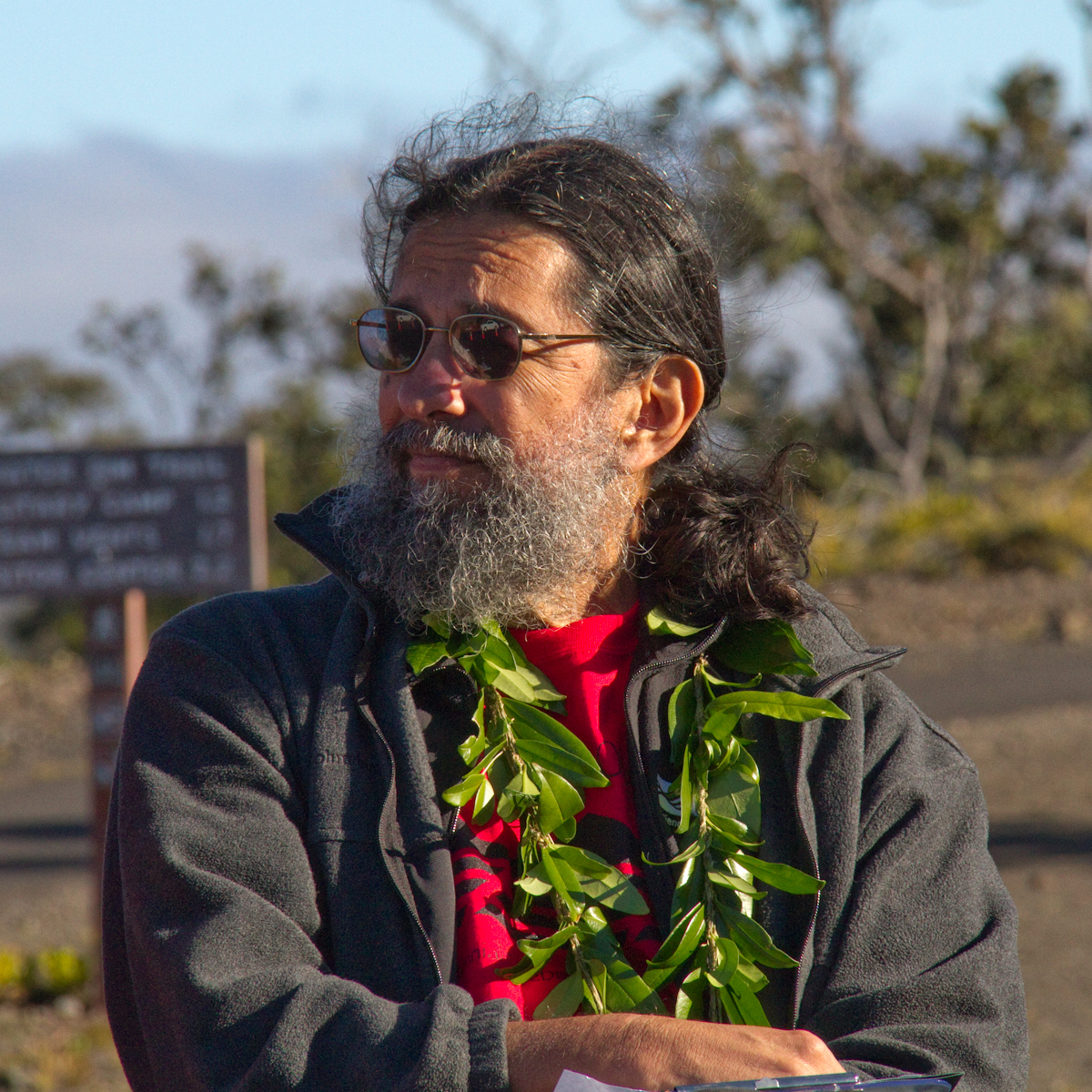
- Born: James Puupai Kauahikaua; August 1, 1951; Honolulu, Territory of Hawaii, U.S.
- Died: October 8, 2023 (aged 72); Hilo, Hawaii, U.S.
- Other names: "Dr. Jim"
- Education: Pomona College (BA); University of Hawaiʻi at Mānoa (MS, PhD)
- Scientific career
- Thesis: The subsurface resistivity structure of Kilauea Volcano, Hawaiʻi (1982)
- Doctoral advisor: Eduard Berg
- Website: www.usgs.gov/staff-profiles/jim-kauahikaua

James Puupai Kauahikaua (August 1, 1951 – October 8, 2023) was an American geophysicist and volcanologist who served as the 19th Scientist-in-Charge of the Hawaiian Volcano Observatory from October 2004 to March 2015. He was the first Scientist-in-Charge at the Observatory to be of Hawaiian ancestry.

== Personal life ==
Kauahikaua was born in Honolulu on August 1, 1951. His family lived in Nuuanu when he was born, though they moved to Kailua soon after. He did not have a particularly Hawaiian upbringing, but considered himself an "academic Hawaiian" for his scholarly interest in Hawaiian culture and sciences.

Kauahikaua was a cancer survivor. In an interview with PBS Hawaii, he described waking up with double vision, and after much consulting with doctors, was diagnosed with nasopharyngeal cancer. After many rounds of chemo and radiation treatment, the cancer was killed and he began remission in 2003. It was described as the scariest experience of his life, more so than anything else during his career. The treatments left him deaf in one ear and hard of hearing in the other.

Kauahikaua died from meningitis complications in his Hilo, Hawaii home on the morning of October 8, 2023, at the age of 72.

== Career ==
Kauahikaua began his career with the USGS in 1976, originally working out of Denver, but then moved to Hawaii after a year.

In 1998, he participated in an archaeology excavation in Hawaiʻi Volcanoes National Park with the U.S. Department of the Interior. This work was featured in part of a 2003 report. As well as his academic papers, his research was cited or otherwise used in multiple U.S. Government reports.

Kauahikaua was awarded funds from the National Science Foundation for research in collaboration with the University of Oregon for the 2002–04 fiscal years.

Kauahikaua served as scientist-in-charge of the Observatory from 2004 to 2015, preceding Tina Neal and following Donald A. Swanson. During this time, he coordinated responses to multiple notable geologic events, including the Mauna Loa unrest of 2004–05, the Kīholo Bay earthquake, as well as other eruptions at Kīlauea and elsewhere. He stepped aside after over ten years to make room for personal research. He continued to work for the Observatory through the 2018 lower Puna eruption, and continued to work there as a research geophysicist.

In May 2015, he won a DOI Meritorious Service Award from the U.S. Department of the Interior in recognition of his scientific work for the Geological Survey. In 2019, he appeared as a panelist at a workshop hosted by University of Colorado Boulder, in which he talked about his experiences as a Hawaiian volcanologist and gave perspective to the 2018 eruption of Kīlauea.

Kauahikaua was often consulted by the news media as a volcanology expert, especially during the 2022 eruption of Mauna Loa.

=== Writing ===
Kauahikaua was the author of Volcano: Creation in Motion, a book about Pele, the Hawaiian deity of volcanoes.
