= David Phillips (geologist) =

Geologist

- Education: University of Hawaiʻi at Hilo (BS); University of Hawaiʻi at Mānoa (PhD)
- Spouse: Francine "Fran" Coloma
- Scientific career
- Workplaces: Hawaiian Volcano Observatory (DSIC)

David Phillips has been Deputy Scientist-in-Charge (DSIC) at the Hawaiian Volcano Observatory since 2020. (Note: Following the announcement by the U.S. Geological Survey, an article from UH Hilo Stories erroneously stated he became the DSIC at Hawaiʻi Volcanoes National Park, not the Hawaiian Volcano Observatory.) He served as acting Scientist-in-Charge in the interim period between Tina Neal and Ken Hon.

== Career ==
Prior to his post as DSIC, he was working out of Boulder, Colorado as a program manager for UNAVCO.

Throughout his career, he has been consulted by the press as a volcano expert, notably when he spoke to the Associated Press multiple times on behalf of the Observatory about the 2022 eruption of Mauna Loa.
