= Dave Phillips =

Dave Phillips may refer to:

- Dave Phillips (musician) (born 1969), Swiss noise musician
- Dave Phillips (ice hockey) (born 1987), British ice hockey player
- Dave Phillips (umpire) (born 1943), American baseball umpire
- Dave Benson Phillips (born 1967), British children's television presenter
- Dave Phillips (maze designer) (born 1951), American maze designer
- Dave Phillips (soccer) (born 1961), general manager of the Wichita Wings indoor soccer team

== See also ==
- David Phillips (disambiguation)
