= Donald A. Swanson =

American volcanologist (born 1938)

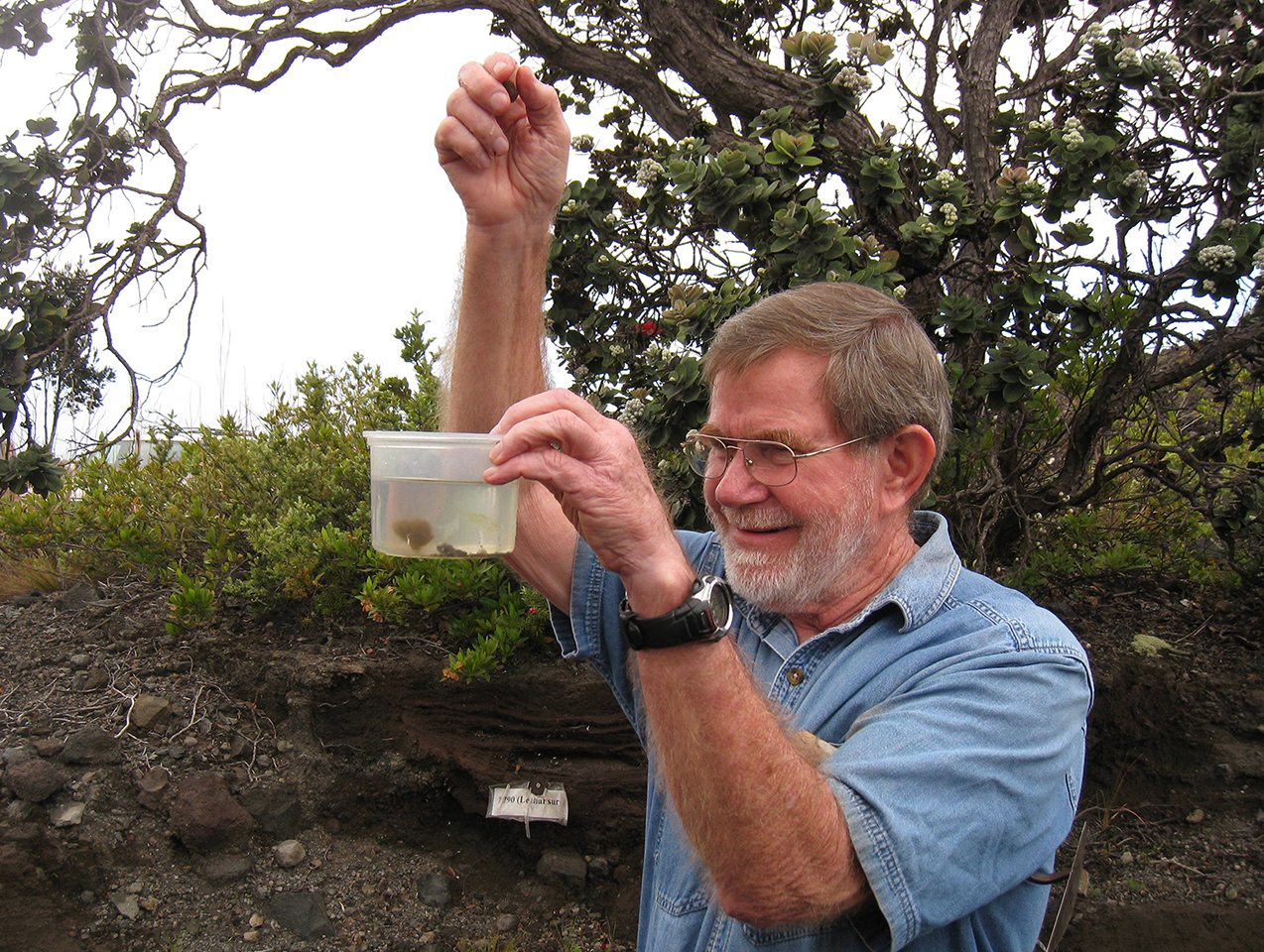
Swanson in 2015

Donald Alan Swanson (born July 25, 1938; also known as Don Swanson) is an American geologist. During his career with the U.S. Geological Survey, he served at different times as the scientist-in-charge of the Cascades Volcano Observatory and Hawaiian Volcano Observatory, and has been noted for his contributions to understanding the volcanology of the Columbia River Basalts, Kīlauea, and the Cascade Arc.

Swanson was born on July 25, 1938. He attended Washington State University in Pullman, Washington – from which he graduated with a geology degree in 1960 – before receiving a Ph.D. in geology from Johns Hopkins University in 1964. He completed postdoctoral studies with NATO in Germany, where he studied Vulcano, Italy, and Gran Canaria, Spain. In 1965, he joined the U.S. Geological Survey (USGS) as part of their team mapping Oregon.

From 1968 to 1971, Swanson completed a rotation as a staff geologist at the Hawaiian Volcano Observatory (HVO), and was stationed there during the beginning of the Mauna Ulu eruption at Kīlauea. For the next nine years, Swanson focused his studies on the Columbia River Basalts and also established monitoring at Mount Hood and Mount St. Helens of the Cascade Range.

Beginning in 1980, Swanson was a geologist with the USGS monitoring team for Cascades volcanoes – along with Bob Christiansen, David A. Johnston, James G. Moore, and others – where he researched the geodesy of the volcano leading up to the eruption. He was stationed at an observatory in Vancouver, Washington, when Mount St. Helens erupted on May 18, 1980. Swanson was a member of the USGS' initial response team to the eruption site and was engaged in documenting the blast and subsequent lahars. Following the creation of the Cascades Volcano Observatory in the wake of eruption, Swanson was made lead geologist from 1980 to 1986 and scientist-in-charge from 1986 until 1990.

Swanson moved to the University of Washington in Seattle in 1990, where he worked as an affiliate professor in the geological sciences department and made annual trips to the island of Hawaiʻi to study fault systems at Kīlauea. In 1997, he became the scientist-in-charge of the HVO, a role he held until 2004, when he returned to working as a research scientist.

In 2016, Swanson received the Shoemaker Award for Lifetime Achievement in Communications from the USGS. That same year, the Mineralogy, Geochemistry, Petrology, and Volcanology Division of the Geological Society of America awarded Swanson the Distinguished Geologic Career Award.

Swanson funded the Swanson Graduate Student Endowed Support Fund at the University of Hawaiʻi at Mānoa in 2017, which provides fellowships for graduate students in geology or geophysics at the university. He retired to emeritus status in 2019. As of 2021, he was living in Hilo, Hawaii.

In 2024, Swanson participated in public events commemorating the centennial of the Halemaʻumaʻu eruption of Kīlauea. Also in 2024, he appeared on the YouTube channel of geologist Nick Zentner.
