= Tilling =

Tilling can mean:

- Tillage, an agricultural preparation of the soil.
- TILLING (molecular biology)
- Tilling is a fictional town in the Mapp and Lucia novels of E. F. Benson.
- Tilling Green, Ledshire, is a fictional village in Patricia Wentworth's Miss Silver novel, Poison in the Pen.
- The Tilling Group, once a major British bus company and later a conglomerate.
- Thomas Tilling was Cockney rhyming slang for a shilling.
- People with the surname Tilling
  - Robert I. Tilling, geologist
  - Roger Tilling, a British broadcaster
  - Thomas Tilling, founder of the Tilling Group
- Tilling slang when someone rubs someone else behind, in a circular motion for a long period of time
