= Bob Christiansen (geologist) =

American geologist (1935–2022)

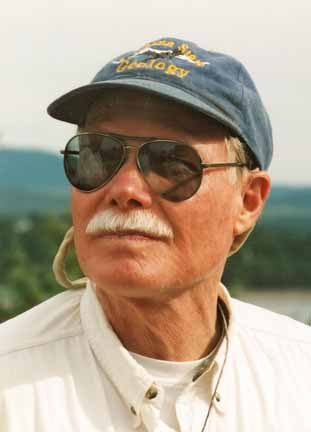
USGS photograph of Christiansen

Robert Lorenz Christiansen (June 13, 1935 – September 15, 2022) was an American geologist known for his expertise in volcanology. As a geologist employed by the U.S. Geological Survey, he was the founding scientist-in-charge of the Yellowstone Volcano Observatory.

Bob Christiansen was born in Kingsburg, California, on June 13, 1935, the son of Lorenz and Sara Christiansen. In 1956, he graduated from Stanford University with a Bachelor of Science degree in geology. He attained an M.S. degree in 1957, and worked for the Utah Construction Company until 1958, when he joined the U.S. Army. From 1960 until receiving his Ph.D. from Stanford in 1961, he was a geologist at the Stanford Research Institute.

In 1961, Christiansen began working at the U.S. Geological Survey. For his first 10 years, Christiansen worked from the USGS office in Denver, Colorado. Christiansen's work in Yellowstone (the Yellowstone Plateau region) began in 1965, when he was a member a group tasked with conducting a comprehensive geologic assessment and creating a geologic map of Yellowstone National Park; he focused on quaternary volcanic geology within the wider project. Christiansen's research in Yellowstone during the 1960s, particularly his efforts to find the Yellowstone volcano, is described in Bill Bryson's A Short History of Nearly Everything: "By coincidence just at this time NASA decided to test some new high-altitude cameras by taking photographs of Yellowstone ... As soon as Christiansen saw the photos he realized why he had failed to spot the caldera: virtually the whole park—2.2 million acres—was caldera."

Through Christiansen remains best known as a Yellowstone geologist, he notably published research on other regions of the United States. For example, from 1971 to 1973 Christiansen was stationed at the Hawaiian Volcano Observatory to study the islands' volcanism, including the 1790 eruption of Kīlauea. During this time, he also published articles on the Cenozoic volcanism and plate tectonics of the wider Western U.S. Additionally, following the 1980 eruption of Mount St. Helens, Christiansen was named the chief scientist for monitoring and scientific analysis of the eruption. Studying Mount Shasta in the later 1980s, Christiansen identified its sector collapse by matching deposits to those of Mount St. Helens.

Following his stints in Colorado and Hawaii, Christiansen moved to the USGS office in Menlo Park, California. He was elected in 1997 to the American Association for the Advancement of Science. When the Yellowstone Volcano Observatory was formed in 2001, Christiansen served as its first scientist-in-charge. Christiansen undertook a mapping project of Henry's Fork Caldera in the vicinity of Island Park, Idaho, which was completed in 2001. He retired in 2003.

On September 15, 2022, Christiansen died in Palo Alto, California.
