= Robert W. Decker =

American volcanologist (1927–2005)

Robert "Bob" Decker
- Born: 11 March 1927; Williamsport, Pennsylvania
- Died: 11 June 2005 (aged 78); Mariposa, California
- Education: Massachusetts Institute of Technology (BS, MS); Colorado School of Mines (PhD)
- Scientific career
- Fields: Volcanology
- Workplaces: Bethlehem Steel (1949–50), New World Exploration Company (1952–54), Dartmouth College (1954–79), Hawaiian Volcano Observatory (1979–84)

Robert Wayne Decker (11 March 1927 – 11 June 2005) was an American volcanologist.

== Life ==
He attended the Massachusetts Institute of Technology and received his BS degree in 1949 and his MS in 1951. He continued his graduate studies at the Colorado School of Mines and received his DS in 1953 on the geology of the Independence Range in northern Elko County, Nevada. He worked for Bethlehem Steel in Venezuela 1949–50, New World Exploration Company 1951–54, University of Illinois 1954, Dartmouth College 1954–79 and Hawaiian Volcano Observatory 1979–84. He moved to California in 1984. He established the Center for the Study of Active Volcanoes (CSAV) at the University of Hawaii at Hilo in 1989.

He was president of the International Association of Volcanology and Chemistry of the Earth's Interior (IAVCEI, 1975–79).

He was married to Joann Stabley from Williamsport, Pennsylvania on June 6, 1950. There are 4 Decker sons from this marriage. She was instrumental in copyreading and typing his MS thesis and his Doctoral thesis and assisted him in collecting the geologic information contained therein. Joann accompanied him on many trips around the world including his initial work at the Hawaiian Volcano Observatory, where he served as Scientist-in-Charge from 1979–84. They were divorced on December 3, 1973. He was later married to Barbara Henneberger. There were no children from this marriage.

== Selected publications ==
- Robert Decker, Barbara Decker (1991) Mountains of Fire. The Nature of Volcanoes, Cambridge University Press
- Robert Decker (April 1, 1993) Von Pompeji zum Pinatubo - Die Urgewalt der Vulkane, Basel: Birkhäuser, 1 ed., ISBN 978-3764327972
- Robert Decker, Barbara Decker (2001) Volcanoes in America´s National Parks, Odyssey Guides
- Robert Decker, Barbara Decker (2005) Volcanoes, San Francisco: Freeman, 4 ed., ISBN 978-0716789291
- Double Decker Press:
  - Robert Decker, Barbara Decker (2007) Road Guide to Hawaii Volcanoes National Park, Double Decker Press, 6 ed., pp. 48, ISBN 978-1888898118
  - Robert Decker, Barbara Decker (2007) Road Guide to Haleakala and the Hana Highway , Double Decker Press, 3 ed., pp. 48, ISBN 978-1888898125
  - Robert Decker, Barbara Decker (2006) Road Guide to Joshua Tree National Park, Double Decker Press, 3 ed., pp. 48, ISBN 978-1888898101
  - Robert Decker, Barbara Decker (2004) Road Guide to Death Valley National Park, Double Decker Press, updated ed., pp. 48, ISBN 978-1888898088
  - Robert Decker, Barbara Decker (2004) Road Guide to Crater Lake National Park, Double Decker Press, 3 ed., pp. 48, ISBN 978-1888898095
  - Robert Decker, Barbara Decker (2002) Road Guide to Mount St. Helens, Double Decker Press, updated ed., pp. 48, ISBN 978-1888898064
  - Robert Decker, Barbara Decker (1997) Road Guide to Lassen Volcanic National Park, Double Decker Press, 1 ed., pp. 48, ISBN 978-1888898026
  - Robert Decker, Barbara Decker (1996) Road Guide to Mount Rainier National Park, Double Decker Press, pp. 48, ISBN 1888898003
