= Dave Phillips (musician) =

Swiss experimental musician (born 1969)

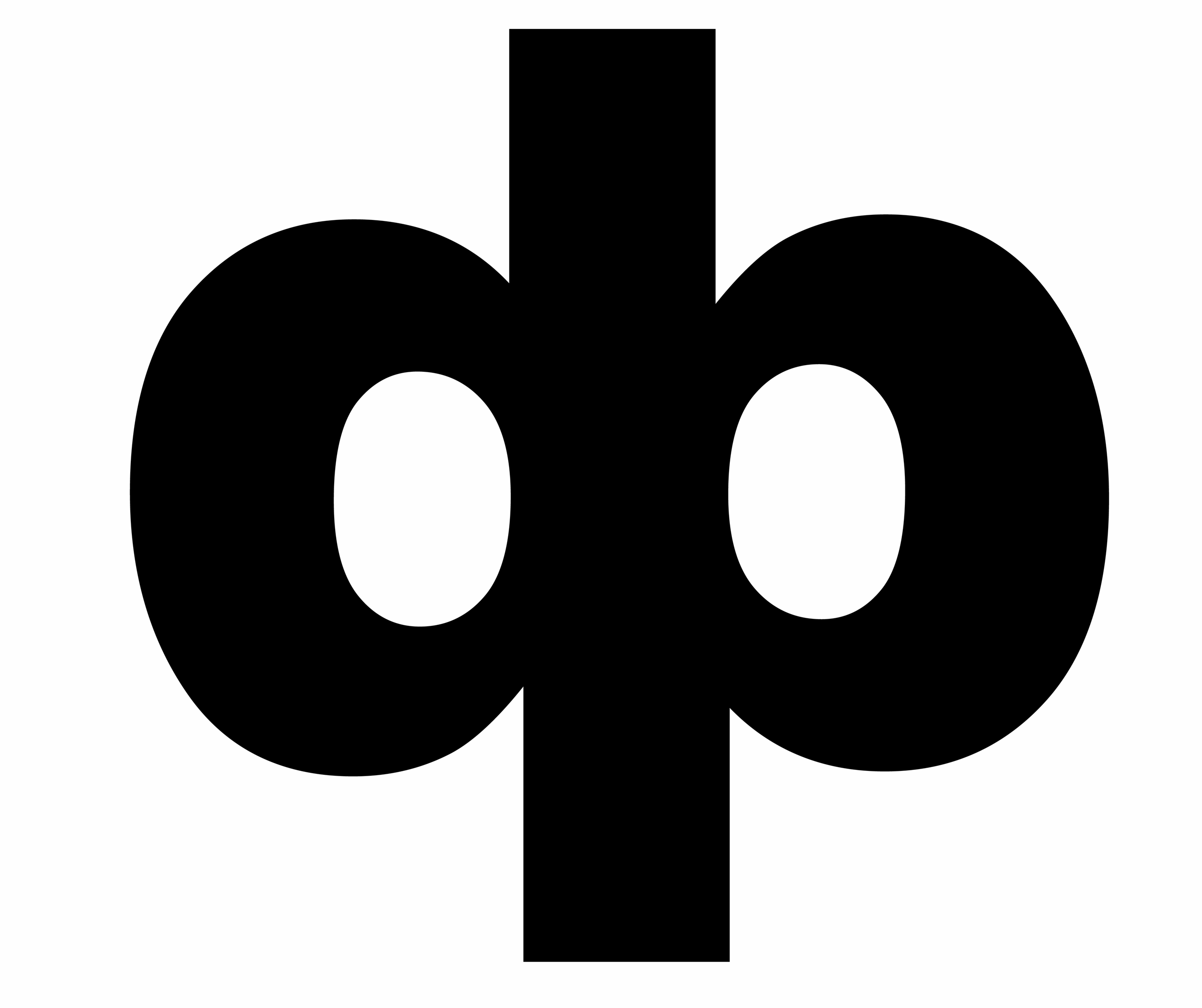

Background information
- Also known as: dp
- Born: January 18, 1969 (age 57); Zug, Switzerland
- Origin: Zug, Switzerland
- Genres: noise, experimental, Musique concrète, Field recordings, independent, drone, ambient, electronic, Ritual music, industrial
- Occupation: Sonic activist
- Years active: 1984–present
- Labels: Schimpfluch, Tochnit Aleph, Blossoming Noise, Nazlo, Total Black, Misanthropic Agenda, Flag Day, RRR, Attenuation Circuit, Monotype, Alku, Ideal, Nihilist...
- Website: davephillips.ch

Dave Phillips (born January 18, 1969) also known as dp, is a British-French-Swiss experimental noise musician, composer, performer and multimedia artist. He is best known for his solo work, but also as part of Schimpfluch-Gruppe, as founder of the group OHNE, as one half of Perverts In White Shirts, and as founding member of Swiss grindcore pioneers Fear Of God. He has been active since the mid 1980s in independent metal, hardcore punk and noise music scenes. Phillips refers to his oeuvre as Ritual Protest Music.

== Life ==
Phillips was born on 18 January 1969 in Zug, Switzerland to a British father and French mother. At age five he buys his first 7", Waterloo by ABBA, then discovers heavy metal age eight and hardcore punk age twelve. He grows up in Oberägeri from 1974 to 1985, then lives in Unterägeri.

Phillips moved to Zürich in 1988 to join RecRec Music, a record label and distributor of independent music, and a cooperative, with whom he stayed until 1994. He began organising concerts, amongst others the first live appearances of Extreme Noise Terror, Carcass and Godflesh in Switzerland. From 1995 until 1997 he worked for Jecklin, Switzerland's then-biggest classical music record shop. In 1997 he experiences a heavy injury that damages his back for life. He returns to the stage in 2001.

From 2020 onwards Phillips lives with his parents as carer for 15 months, and with his siblings accompanied their father right up to his death. One and a half years later they again provide end-of-life care, this time for their mother. These experiences have a profound impact on him.

== Career ==
Phillips performed live for the first time in 1981 (age 12) with Unterägeri punk band Neo Pogos playing cardboard drums.

In 1984 Phillips and Reto Kühne form Messiah, but his involvement is short. Phillips begins his solo career in 1987, though his first album only appears in 1994. From 1988 to 1999 he plays with Stephen Thomas under different names (Tower of Beef, D&S, Doug&Chuck) from noise rock, dance/ballet music, to sound collage and Plunderphonics. They perform live once and release one posthumous collection in 2023. Phillips has been DJing since 1995 under the monicker eva d., playing "all styles my style".

From 1999 until 2002 Phillips and Reto Mäder participated in Zeitgenossen, a monthly radio-show for new music with on Radio Kanal K in Aarau.

In 2000 Phillips and Tom Smith (of TLASILA) found OHNE and include Daniel Löwenbrück (Tochnit Aleph, Raionbashi) and Reto Mäder (rm74) in the line-up. OHNE were active until 2004. That same year, Phillips started dead peni (stylised as all lower case), a one-man doom metal/sludge project.

In 2005 Phillips and Tochnit Aleph curate one evening for the LUFF/Lausanne Underground Film and Music Festival titled ‘Nuits Bruit des Corps’ including Masonna, Zbigniew Karkowski, Daniel Menche and dp's only performance of hole/holy. That same year Phillips is part of Camp Victory, a noise-opera by Gilles Aubry and Stéphane Montavon.

In 2008/2009 Phillips plays bass and vocals for ‘Ketsu No Ana’, a grindcore/blackened crust outfit with Zürich squatters. After the squat they rehearsed in got raided and their drummer disappeared they split up.

Phillips curated a series of experimental/sound art/new music live events, first called entart, then atonal_zürich, then atra, from 2013 to 2017 nearly-monthly at Klubi (later Umbo) in Zürich, and from 2018 to 2019 at Ausland, Berlin.

As of 2025, Phillips has played around 800 concerts in 55 countries and has appeared on over 300 releases.

== Selected Discography ==
=== Solo ===
- 1994: dp I MC (dp Oberägeri)
- 1995: dp II MC (dp Oberägeri)
- 1997: dp III MC (Schimpfluch Zürich)
- 2001: dp IIII CD (Manufracture Lausanne)
- 2003: dp Tapes CDR (Tochnit Aleph Berlin)
- 2003: dp Insect CDR (Digitally Destroyed Daffodil Discs Zürich)
- 2003: dp The Hermeneutics Of Fear Of God 12" (Tochnit Aleph Berlin)
- 2004: dp The Golden Age Of Denial An Avoidance CD (Recordings For The Summer Leipzig)
- 2004: dp IIIII CD (Groundfault Los Angeles)
- 2006: dp 6 CD (The Egg And We Minsk)
- 2006: dp A Collection Of Curses CD (Blossoming Noise Liburn)
- 2007: dp Field Recordings CD (Little Enjoyer New York)
- 2008: dead peni 2-4(+1) CD (Blossoming Noise Lilburn)
- 2008: dp They Live LP (RRR Lowell)
- 2009: dp Frogs Rain 2CDR (Scrotum Leipzig)
- 2010: dp ? CD (Heart & Crossbone Israel)
- 2010: dp Ghi Âm Việt Nam CD (Little Enjoyer New York)
- 2012: dp Suara Alam Indonesia 2CD (Nuun Hazebrouck)
- 2012: dp Abgrund LP (Second Sleep Italy)
- 2012: dp A Collection Of Hair 2CD (Heart & Crossbone Israel)
- 2014: dp At The Heart Of It All CDR (Ruido Horrible Mexico & Ruido Latino Colombia)
- 2014: dp Homo Animalis 2CD (Schimpfluch Associates Zürich)
- 2014: dp I See Better With My Eyes Closed Flexi-7" (Absurd Estranhas Sao Paulo & Ocupacoes Recife)
- 2015: dp Oberägeri Digital (dp Zürich)
- 2015: dp Songs of a Dying Species CDR (Noisendo Portugal)
- 2016: dp A Collection Of Fingers Digital (dp Zürich)
- 2017: dp South Africa Recordings 2CD (dp Zürich)
- 2017: dp Selective Memory / Perception CD (Noise Below Athens & Fréquences Critiques Paris)
- 2017: dp Rise LP (Ideal Stockholm)
- 2017: dp Mutations 4 & 5 MC (Nazlo Moscow)
- 2018: dp Ritual Protest Music LP (Urbsounds Bratislava)
- 2018: dp Clearing Lathe-10" (Licht-ung/Spalt-ung Leverkusen)
- 2019: dp Mutations 6 & 7 MC (Perfect Law Releases Providence)
- 2019: dp The Sixth Mass Extinction LP (Total Black Berlin)
- 2019: dp A Drink on The Ink Spots Reel-to-reel (Nazlo Moscow)
- 2020: dp Post Homo Sapiens MC (Etched Anomalies Montréal)
- 2021: dp Disappear LP (Total Black Berlin)
- 2021: dp Humanity Is The Virus MC (Tribe Tapes Raleigh)
- 2022: dp To Death CD (Misanthropic Agenda Houston)
- 2022: dp A Collection of Excuses 4x3" CDR (Debila Records Slovenia)
- 2022: dp Sleep Concert Digital (dp Zürich)
- 2022: dp Inside Outside / Other Rooms Lathe-10" (Nazlo Tbilisi)
- 2023: dp Human Nature Denied CD (Flag Day Records West Virginia)
- 2023: dp The Last Journey Digital (dp Unterägeri)
- 2023: dp The More We Try To Manage And Control Nature, The More Unmanageable And Uncontrollable Our Problems Become 7" (Architecture Portland)
- 2023: dp Should A Seeker Not Find... /Cicada Trance 2CD (No Part Of It Chicago)
- 2024: dp Response Ability Digital (Petit Bardo Paris)
- 2024: dp Nothing’s Wrong CD (Flag Day West Virginia)
- 2024: dp Live At Fugu Da Nang Vietnam 17 apr 2024 Digital (Nostalgie de la Boue Abidjan)
- 2025: dp A Collection Of Degenerations 5x3" CDR (Debila Records Slovenia)

=== with Perverts In White Shirts ===
- 2017: Power To The Sheople LP (Cruel Bones Zürich)
- 2022: Meaning What Exactly? LP (Misanthropic Agenda Houston)
- 2025: CULTurally Appropriated Songs 2CD (Misanthropic Agenda Houston)

=== with Schimpfluch-Gruppe ===
- 1997: Shitpflug CDR (Ignominious USA)
- 1997: Do-Ku VHS (Gmbh Paris)
- 1997: Arschloch-Onna with Masonna CD (Japan Overseas Osaka)
- 2007: Schimpfluch Commune Int 2MC+CDR (Nihilist Chicago)
- 2007: For The Tasmanian Devils 9*lathe (Cipher Productions Tasmania)
- 2009: Paris Aktionen LP (Bennifer Editions Toronto & Tochnit Aleph Berlin)
- 2013: Nigredo MC (Fragment Factory Hamburg)

=== with OHNE ===
- 2002: 1 CD (ohnemego Austria)
- 2003: 020510 CDR (Spirals Of Involution Yaroslavl)
- 2003: 020503 CD (The Egg And We Minsk)
- 2004: 02004 CDR (Tochnit Aleph Berlin)

=== with Fear Of God ===
- 1988: Fear Of God 7" (Temple of Love Germany)
- 1988: As Statues Fell 12" (Off The Disk Zürich)
- 1992: Konserven 7" (Two Sheds St.Gallen)
- 1992: Pneumatic Slaughter 7" (Atrocious USA)
- 2003: Zeitgeist 2LP (Absurd São Paulo)

=== Collaborations ===
- 2000: For Rudolf Eb.er with Genetic Transmission, CDR (DSBMW Poland)
- 2001: Half Human/Chair Missing with Kid Commando, picture 7" (Lady Godiva Gothenburg)
- 2003: Easy Vegan Cooking with Eric Boros 7" (Manufacture Lausanne & Pale Mother Denmark)
- 2005: Illusion Is A Common Condition with Randy H.Y. Yau CD (Auscultare San Francisco)
- 2006: At A Loss For Words 7" with John Wiese (Blossoming Noise Lilburn)
- 2007: Das Zerstören Zum Gebären CD with The New Blockaders (Blossoming Noise Lilburn)
- 2010: We Are None Of Us with Francisco Meirino CD (Domizil Zürich)
- 2010: Mutations with Cornelia Hesse-Honegger LP (Ini Itu Brussels)
- 2012: боринософил with Alexei Borisov & Olga Nosova CD (Monotype Warsaw)
- 2014 Medusa with Aspec(t) CD (Noise Below/Excrete Greece)
- 2015: The Invisible Cage Of Comfort with Chris Galarreta MC (Fragment Factory Hamburg)
- 2015: Insect Apocalypse with Hiroshi Hasegawa CD (Monotype Poland)
- 2016: The Ghost Of Freaks with Michael Esposito Flexi-7" (Phantom Plastics Indiana)
- 2017: untitled with Mei Zhiyong LP (Urbsounds Bratislava)
- 2020: Colonial War And Mental Disorders MC with Meira Asher & Eran Sachs (Raash Jerusalem)
- 2022: The Best Of Chuck & Doug with Stephen Thomas MC (Attenuation Circuit, Augsburg)

=== Film scores ===
- 2008: dp L’Îlot by Mario del Curto
- 2010: dp La Chienne by Klaudia Reynicke
- 2019: dp The Call of Cthulhu by Andrew Leman for IoIC
- 2022: dp Un Chien Andalou by Luis Buñuel & Salvador Dalí for IoIC

== Filmography ==
- 2010: Skills/Faces by Jan van Hasselt
- 2013: A Noisy Delivery by GX Jupitter-Larsen
- 2015: Sonic Rituals 声响仪式 by Mei ZhiYong
- 2017: Proceed With Inquiry by Dave Phillips, GX Jupitter-Larsen, Jan van Hasselt, Moju, Remote Control Rectum
- 2019: Tinnitus by Daniil Zinchenko<

== Awards ==
- 2001: Auszeichnung des Aargauer Kuratoriums Beitrag zum künstlerischen Schaffen
- 2005: Six months grant for use of a recording studio in Zürich from the city's culture department (Kulturförderung der Stadt Zürich)

== Exhibitions ==
- 2003: participation at EMA – Electronic Music Archive, curated by Norbert Möslang for Kunsthalle St.Gallen
