= Ruy Finch =

American volcanologist (1890–1957)

2nd Director of the Hawaiian Volcano Observatory
- In office 1940 – 1951
- Preceded by: Thomas A. Jaggar
- Succeeded by: Gordon A. Macdonald

Personal details
- Born: Ruy Herbert Finch; August 30, 1890 Sunbury, Ohio
- Died: March 25, 1957 (aged 66) Watsonville, California

Ruy Herbert Finch (August 30, 1890 – March 25, 1957) was an American volcanologist who served as second director of the Hawaiian Volcano Observatory (HVO) from 1940 to 1951. Finch is known largely for his discovery of the 1790 Footprints, and for the formal addition of block lava to the lava classification types. In 1951, a group of scientists including Finch were named in the journal Science as "outstanding authorities in their respective fields".

== Career ==
Born in Sunbury, Finch was an Ohio native. He attended George Washington University and the University of Chicago before starting his professional career in 1910 by working as a seismologist for the U.S. Weather Bureau. The HVO was formed during his time with the Weather Bureau. In 1919, HVO was merged into the bureau; Finch moved to the island of Hawai‘i in 1923, and was present during the eruption of Kīlauea in 1924.

In 1926, Finch moved to Mineral, California—from that time until 1935, he founded and directed a seismograph station near Lassen Peak, after which he was transferred to Hawaiʻi National Park. During his time at Hawaiʻi, he worked as a park guide, among other jobs. He became director of HVO in 1940, and served until 1951. During his time at the observatory, he worked with multiple other geologists of the time, most notably, T. A. Jaggar and Gordon Macdonald. After his tenure with the observatory, he retired and moved to an apple orchard in Watsonville, California with his family, where he died in 1957.

While Thomas A. Jaggar was starting the observatory, he began a newsletter called The Volcano Letter, a publication on volcanology. When Jaggar retired in 1940 and Finch took over as director, he became editor of the Letter, which later went on to be reprinted by Richard S. Fiske, Tom Simkin, and Elizabeth A. Nielsen as editors—Simkin was also an author of the book Volcanoes of the World.
