= Jerry P. Eaton =

American seismologist and volcanologist (1926–2004)

- Born: December 11, 1926; Central Valley (California)
- Died: April 2, 2004 (aged 77); Los Altos, California
- Known for: Seismology, Volcanology

Academic background
- Education: University of California, Berkeley (BA, PhD)

Jerry P. Eaton (December 11, 1926 – April 2, 2004) was an American seismologist and volcanologist who served as director of the Hawaiian Volcano Observatory from 1956–58, and as scientist-in-charge from 1960–61. He was born in 1926, on a farm in California's Central Valley near Fresno. He died of cancer in 2004, aged 77, at his home in Los Altos, California.

== Education ==
Eaton has received two degrees from University of California, Berkeley; a 1949 B.A. in physics, and a 1953 Ph.D. in geophysics.

== Career ==
Eaton began at the Hawaiian Volcano Observatory in 1953, after completing his Ph.D. During his time there, he was responsible for installing equipment to measure tremors from Kīlauea. The equipment he designed and installed were 5 to 10 times more sensitive than the seismographs already in use, and thus picked up more earthquakes for study. He is also credited with writing the first computer program to pinpoint locations of earthquakes.

After his term as scientist-in-charge, he left the Observatory for the Geological Survey Crustal Studies Branch and went on to develop an earthquake monitoring system for the Rocky Mountain-Great Plains region. He served as president of the Seismological Society of America from 1966–67.

In 1960, he published a paper in the journal Science titled "How Volcanoes Grow", which was later described in SFGATE as "a classic and the most authoritative paper on the subject".
