= National Volcano Early Warning and Monitoring System =

The National Volcano Early Warning and Monitoring System is a U.S. federal program within the U.S. Geological Survey for monitoring volcano activity and providing early warning to threatened areas. It was authorized by the John D. Dingell Jr. Conservation, Management, and Recreation Act on March 12, 2019.

== Background ==
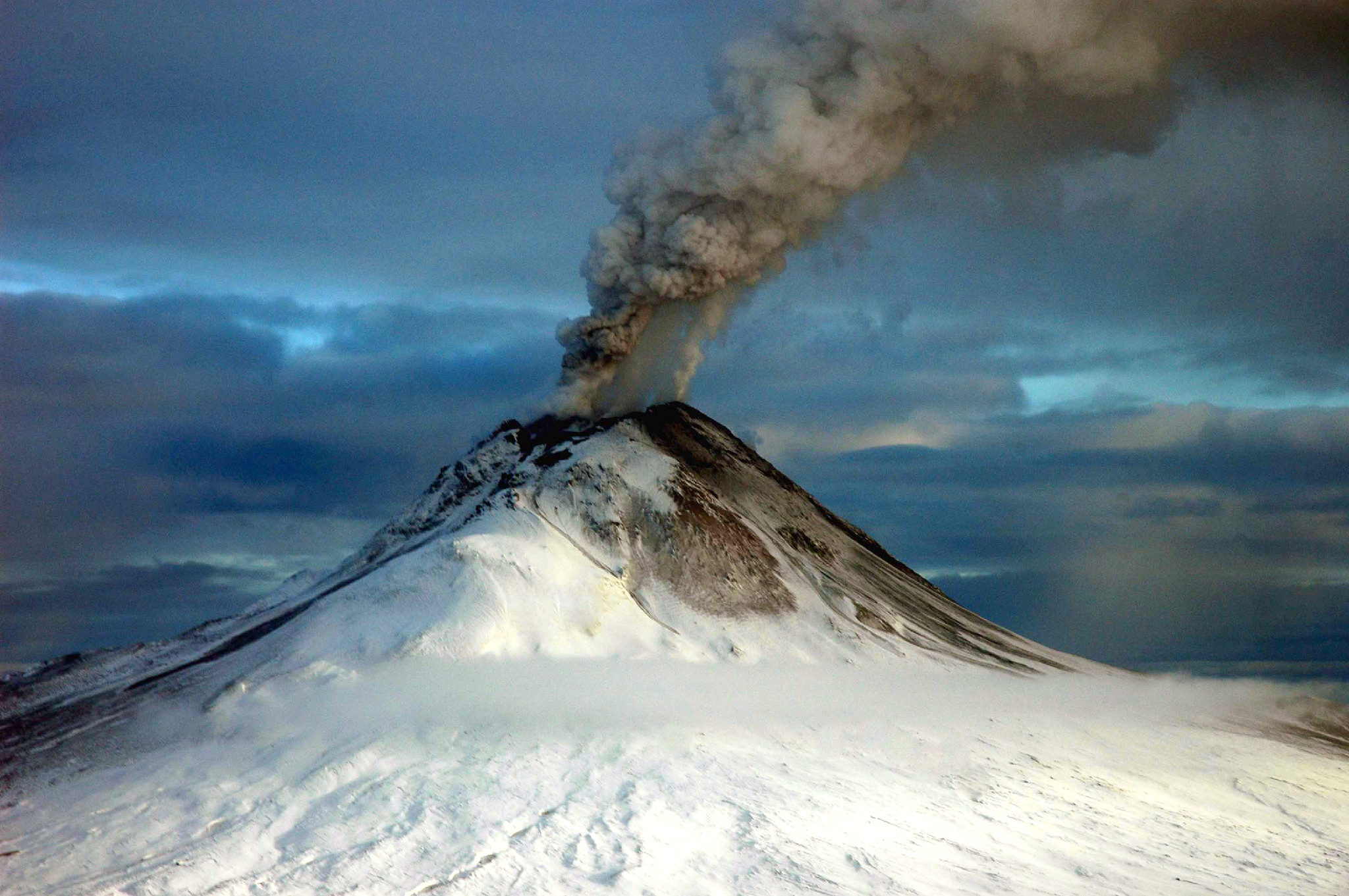
Ash plume from Augustine Volcano, Alaska, Jan 12, 2006

There are 169 young volcanoes in the United States, many of which are considered hazardous due to their proximity to populated areas. The USGS considers many of the more dangerous volcanoes to be under-monitored, lacking adequate scientific instruments on the ground to measure activity and potential threats. Many volcanoes lack any instruments, and the seismometers at other sites are inadequate for useful analysis. One of the most active volcanoes in Washington, Glacier Peak, only has a single seismometer. Improved monitoring capabilities can provide more timely warnings for evacuations and emergency response coordination, and mitigate the impacts of the travel disruptions. Early warnings are particularly critical for air traffic control, which needs to be made aware of ash-producing eruptions in time to reroute airplanes.

The USGS assesses each volcano against a 24-factor hazard and exposure matrix, and assigns a threat level of "very low", "low", "moderate", "high", or "very high". In 2018, 18 volcanoes were rated as "very high" risk, and 39 volcanoes were rated as "high" risk. The "very high" risk volcanoes are in Alaska, Washington, Oregon, California, and Hawaii, with the most dangerous being Kilauea. Some volcano monitoring has been performed by the Volcano Hazards Program, directed by the USGS, but the program lacks sufficient funding to properly close the monitoring gap. According to Charles Mandeville, the program coordinator for the USGS Volcano Hazards Program, the USGS is "somewhere between 30-40 percent of the way to having an ideal monitoring network for those volcanoes”. As of 2018, only three "very high risk" volcanoes are categorized as "well monitored": Kilauea, Mount St. Helens, and Long Valley Caldera.

== Purpose ==
The National Volcano Early Warning and Monitoring System has two purposes:

- To "organize, modernize, standardize, and stabilize the monitoring systems of the volcano observatories in the United States, which includes the Alaska Volcano Observatory, California Volcano Observatory, Cascades Volcano Observatory, Hawaiian Volcano Observatory, and Yellowstone Volcano Observatory".
- To "unify the monitoring systems of volcano observatories in the United States into a single interoperative system".

== Details ==
The USGS must submit a five-year plan for monitoring all U.S. volcanoes at a level commensurate with the threat posed by each. The plan will include upgrades to existing networks on monitored volcanoes and installing networks on unmonitored volcanoes, as well as standardizing on modern tools across all of the volcano observatories. A national volcano data center will coordinate activities among the observatories. A watch office will be operational 24 hours a day, 7 days a week. In addition, the USGS will set up a grants program to support research into techniques for monitoring and analyzing volcanic activity.

The National Volcano Early Warning and Monitoring System was authorized $55,000,000 for fiscal years 2019 through 2023, however the funds were not immediately appropriated. Final appropriations for fiscal year 2021 provided $30 million to the Volcano Hazards Program, which includes the warning and monitoring system.

In April, 2022, the USGS released its Volcano Hazards Program Strategic Science Plan for the five-year period from 2022 to 2026.

As of June, 2022, the USGS had spent approximately $13.5 million on foundational activities for the volcano monitoring system, including a next-generation lahar detection system on Mt. Rainier, upgrading telemetry in Alaska for 27 volcano stations, improving monitoring networks in Oregon, Washington, and Hawaii. In the fiscal year 2023 budget, Congress increased the funding of the system to over $18 million and also included $29 million from a separate account to replace the Hawaiian Volcano Observatory.

== See also ==
- United States Geological Survey National Volcanic Threat Assessment
