= Messiah (Swiss band) =

Swiss extreme metal band

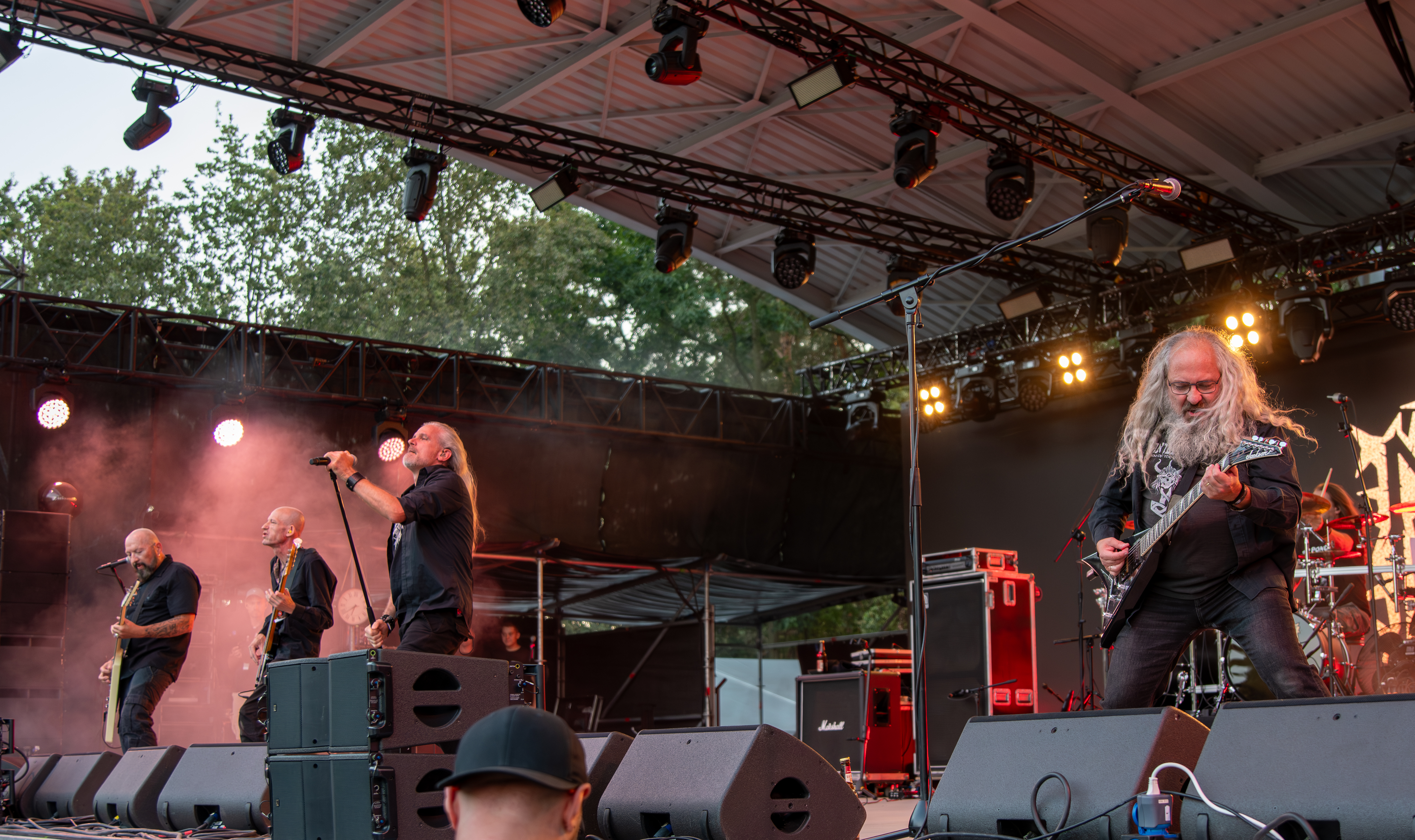
- Messiah in 2024

Background information
- Origin: Switzerland
- Genres: Death metal, thrash metal
- Years active: 1984–1994, 2003, 2017–present
- Labels: Noise, Nuclear Blast, Massacre

Messiah is a death/thrash metal band from Switzerland. The band has had three vocalists over its existence, with vocalist Andy Kaina's tenure the longest. Guitarist R.B. Broggi has been the band's only constant member since inception.

Their sound has been described as "hopelessly un-commercial" by AllMusic and has drawn comparisons to Hellhammer and Kreator. The band's lasti influence on the development of extreme metal substantially eclipses their commercial success.

== History ==
=== Formation, studio album releases and reunion show (1984–2003) ===
Messiah's debut album, Hymn to Abramelin, was released in 1986 through Chainsaw Murder Records. Their second LP, Extreme Cold Weather, came out in 1987 and was re-issued on CD three years later by Nuclear Blast. The release contained the band's debut album. The band signed to Noise Records, which released their next album, Choir of Horrors, in 1991. Messiah released two more albums, Rotten Perish and Underground, through Noise, but disbanded in the mid-1990s.

The band reunited for a show in 2003. Afterwards, the band stated they had no desire to reunite.

=== Reunion, Fatal Grotesque Symbols – Darken Universe, and Fracmont (2017–present) ===
At the end of 2017, the band was asked by a concert promoter to play a few secret shows in Lucerne, Switzerland. The band accepted, and following the shows, started writing a new album in the beginning of 2018.

In June 2020, the band announced that the EP Fatal Grotesque Symbols – Darken Universe would be released on 7 August, and that a full-length album titled Fracmont would be released a month later on 11 September, the band's first studio album in 26 years.

== Band members ==
=== Current members ===
- R.B. Broggi – guitars (1984–1995, 2003, 2017–present)
- Patrick Hersche – bass (1989–1992, 2003, 2017–present)
- Steve Karrer – drums (1990–1995, 2003, 2017–present)
- Marcus Seebach – vocals (2022–present)
- V.O. Pulver – guitars (2023–present)

=== Former members ===
- Rolf "Jazzi" Heer – drums (1984–1989)
- Reto Wilhelm Kühne – bass, vocals (1984–1988)
- Andre Steiner – guitars (1985)
- Dave Phillips - bass (1988–1989)
- Dani Raess – guitar (1989–1990)
- Pete Schuler – drums (1989–1990)
- Christofer Johnsson – vocals (1994–1995)
- Oliver Koll – bass (1994–1995)
- Andy Kaina – vocals (1990–1994, 2003, 2017–2021) (died 2022)

== Discography ==
=== Albums ===
- Hymn to Abramelin (1986)
- Extreme Cold Weather (1987)
- Choir of Horrors (1991)
- Rotten Perish (1992)
- Underground (1994)
- Fracmont (2020)
- Christus Hypercubus (2024)

=== Live Albums ===
- Reanimation, Live at Abart (2010)
- The Choir of Horrors and Rotten Perish Era Live (2018)

=== EPs ===
- Psychomorphia (1990)
- The Ballad of Jesus (1994)
- Fatal Grotesque Symbols – Darken Universe (2020)

=== Compilations ===
- Powerthrash / The Infernal Thrashing (2004)
- Space Invaders (2018)

=== DVDs ===
- 20 Years of Infernal Thrashing Madness (2004)

=== Demos ===
- Demo 1984 (1984)
- Infernal Thrashing (1985)
- Powerthrash (1985)
- Live Baar (1985)
- Extreme Cold Weather (1986)
