= Cornelia Hesse-Honegger =

Swiss illustrator and photographer

- Born: 1944 (age 81–82); Zurich, Switzerland
- Education: University of Zurich
- Known for: illustration and photography of mutated insects
- Style: watercolor

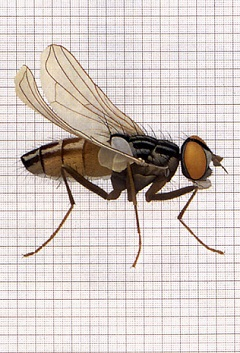
Mutant housefly ‘aristapedia’, watercolor, by Cornelia Hesse-Honegger

Cornelia Hesse-Honegger (born 1944, Zurich, Switzerland) is a Swiss illustrator, watercolor painter, and photographer whose work focuses on the intersection between art and science, zeroing in on the mutagenic effects of radiation on insects. For over two decades, she has worked as a scientific illustrator at the Natural History Museum of the University of Zurich, Switzerland.

== Education ==
Hesse-Honegger worked as an apprentice illustrator in the 1960s with professor Hans Burla of the Zoological Institute University of Zurich.

== Work ==
In 1969, she began collecting and producing watercolor paintings of true bugs. In the mid-1970s, she began to paint leaf bugs, spiders, and beetles, and in 1985, mutated laboratory flies. In 1986, in response to the Chernobyl nuclear powerplant meltdown, she began painting the effects of radioactive fallout and exposure on the insect world. She has since focused on the destructive effects of radiation on humankind and other species. Her work and research took her in 1987 to eastern Sweden, which was highly affected by the radioactive fallout from Chernobyl, where she continued to paint mutated insects. She then traveled to nuclear power plants in Switzerland, the UK, France, and Germany, as well as to Three Mile Island in Pennsylvania, the Nuclear Test Site in Nevada, and nuclear bomb manufacturing facilities at Hanford, Washington, in the United States, to study and paint mutated insects. After the Fukushima nuclear power plant meltdowns, she traveled to Japan to study mutated insects there. In her field work, she has collected over 17,000 true bugs.

Her work has been exhibited at the Museum of Modern Art in New York in the Animal.Anima.Animus exhibition, the Musée d'ethnographie de Genève, Switzerland the Les Abattoirs Musée - Frac Occitanie Toulouse, France, the Kunsthaus Zurich, the Musée d'Art Moderne, Luxembourg, the Museo Metropolitano de Lima, Peru, among other venues.

== Critical reception ==
Martin Kemp has reviewed her work in the journal Nature. She has been interviewed in The Morning News by Rosecrans Baldwin. Her work was the cover story of Cabinet Magazine. The British-American anthropologist Hugh Raffles wrote an article on her work, A Conjoined Fate, for Orion Magazine. Her work has also been reviewed in Smithsonian Magazine, among other publications. In the New York Times, Phillip Hoare wrote:

Cornelia Hesse-Honegger, [is] a contemporary artist dedicated to creating near-perfect watercolors of insects deformed by nuclear fallout. This is sci-fi stuff: flies with legs growing out of their eyes, the kind of mutations that in any other animal would elicit our horrified response, yet which, because they occur in such small creatures, seem almost excusable because almost invisible. In the act of depicting them so exactingly, Hesse-Honegger, whose own child, we are told in an upsetting aside, was born with a club foot, “discovers that the insect is deformed in ways she hadn’t noticed before.” Her aesthetic is that of concrete art, isolated images placed in a grid; her intent is a silent rebuke, a solemn challenge to a world that, even now, is turning again to nuclear power to solve its problems.

== Awards ==
In 1994, Hesse-Honegger received the d’Art-Science-Lettre de la Société Académique d’Education et d’Encouragement award. In 2015, she was awarded with the Nuclear-Free Future Award. In 2018 she was honored as a Laureate of biodiversity and nature conservation at the International Convention of Environmental Laureates of the European Environment Foundation.
