= Robert I. Tilling =

American geologist and volcanologist

Robert I. Tilling (born 1935) is a geologist and volcanologist who served as the scientist-in-charge of the Hawaiian Volcano Observatory from 1975 to 1976. Tilling worked for the U.S. Geological Survey (USGS), and became an emeritus in 2004. He was born in Shanghai, and did not arrive in the U.S. until 1946. After moving to the U.S., he grew up near San Diego, California.

Tilling attended both Pomona College (B.A.) and Yale University (Ph.D.), and joined the U.S. Geological Survey in 1962. In 1971, he worked for NASA's lunar sample program. His service with the U.S. Geological Survey included four years at the Hawaiian Volcano Observatory, with a stint as head scientist. After his tenure there, he left to work for the USGS out of Reston, Virginia. Tilling also coordinated responses to the 1980 eruption of Mount St. Helens; following the eruption, he spoke before Congress, stating that consequent eruptions may occur, though they would likely not be as powerful than the original blast. In 1996, he won the Distinguished Public Service Medal of the Mineralogical Society of America.

Tilling was also formerly a consultant to the Indonesian government on volcanic hazards. During his scientific career, he published over 350 papers on geoscience, for audiences both scientific and general, including in Scientific American and Nature.
