= Gordon A. Macdonald =

American volcanologist (1911–1978)

- Born: 15 October 1911; Boston
- Died: 20 June 1978 (aged 66); Lanikai, Oahu
- Education: University of California, Berkeley
- Scientific career
- Workplaces: Shell Oil, Taft, California (1938), U.S. Geological Survey, Territory of Hawaii (1939–46), University of Southern California (1947–48), Hawaiian Volcano Observatory (1948–55), U.S. Geological Survey, Denver CO (1956–57), Hawaii Institute of Geophysics (HIG), University of Hawaii (1958–78)

Gordon Andrew Macdonald (Boston, 15 October 1911 – Lanikai, 20 June 1978) was a notable American volcanologist. Macdonald was a Fellow of the Geological Society of America, the American Geophysical Union, the Mineralogical Society of America, and the American Association for the Advancement of Science.

== Life ==
His father John Austin Macdonald, son of Stephen Andrew Macdonald delivered wines to Boston hotels. But he lost his income with the Prohibition (1920) and died in 1922. Grace Macdonald and her two children moved to California (1926); Mac graduated the Garfield High School, East Los Angeles in 1928. Macdonald and Earl Irving graduated in geology, at the University of California, Los Angeles with the joint senior thesis "The Genesis of Certain Banded Gneisses and Trachtitoidal Diorites in the San Rafael and Verdugo Hills, Los Angeles County, California". Next year he wrote his Master thesis "Sediments of Santa Monica Bay, California" (1934), and went to University of California, Berkeley.

Howel Williams (1898–1980), the dean of American volcanologists, had his seminar on volcanoes at Berkeley (1936). Mac had sabbatical leaves 1964–65 and 1970–71; he spent time in residence at Berkeley and mapped the Lassen Peak area, northern California again. He had already mapped the region in 1956–57. In 1970, he repeated Howel Williams' seminar and finished his book 'Volcanoes'. His geologic maps cover an area of 10,500 km^{2} in Hawaii and California.

Harold T. Stearns (U.S. Geological Survey groundwater program) had already mapped the groundwater resources on some of the islands of the Territory of Hawaii. Mac joined him (summer 1939) and both continued mapping the groundwater resources. Mauna Loa erupted in 1940 and 1942, and Mac was given time to describe those eruptions; he met Thomas A. Jaggar (1871–1953, HVO's first director), then retired in Honolulu. On the morning of 1 April 1946 an Aleutian tsunami struck Hawaii. Macdonald, Francis Shepard of Scripps and Doak Cox, geologist for the Hawaii Sugar Planter's Association, wrote a study on it.

The National Park Service, which had administered the Hawaiian Volcano Observatory (HVO) since 1935, transferred control back to the U.S. Geological Survey (1948). Ruy Finch, HVO's Director, was ill and asked Macdonald to join him; he accepted. On 6 January 1949, Mauna Loa erupted, and its activity lasted 6 years. Mac was HVO's director from January 1951 to 1955. In 1958, Macdonald accepted a position at the Hawaii Institute of Geophysics (HIG) and the Department of Geology and Geophysics University of Hawaii.

He was president of the International Association of Volcanology and Chemistry of the Earth's Interior (IAVCEI) during the period 1967–1971. The Macdonald seamount (5,600 km south of Hawaii) and the mineral macdonaldite (IMA 1964–010) were named in his honour. Phyllosilicate macdonaldite was discovered near the Sierra Nevada foothills, California. His PhD Thesis "Geology of the Western Sierra Nevada Between Kings and San Joaquin Rivers, California" (1938) covers this area; Adolf Pabst (1899–1990) was professor at University of California, Berkeley.

At his death, Mac was survived by his sister Janet and his children: John, Duncan, James and Bill.

== Selected publications ==
- Stearns, Harold Thornton; Macdonald, Gordon Andrew (1946). Geology and ground-water resources of the island of Hawaii. Bulletin. Vol. 9. United States Geological Survey. p. 245.
- G. A. Macdonald; F.P. Shepard; D.C. Cox (1950). "The tsunami of April 1, 1946". Scripps Inst. Oceanogr. Bull. 5 (6). Univ. Calif.: 391–528.
- Macdonald, G. A.; Katsura, T. (1964). "Chemical composition of Hawaiian lavas". Journal of Petrology. 5 (1): 82–133. Bibcode:1964JPet....5...82M. doi:10.1093/petrology/5.1.82.
- Macdonald, G. A. (1968). "Composition and origin of Hawaiian lavas". Geological Society of America Memoirs. 116: 477–522. doi:10.1130/MEM116-p477.
- Macdonald, Gordon A. (May 1972). Volcanoes (1 ed.). Prentice Hall. pp. 544. ISBN 978-0139422195.
- Macdonald, Gordon A.; Abbott, Agatin Townsend; Peterson, Frank L. (September 1983). Volcanoes in the Sea: The Geology of Hawaii (2 ed.). University of Hawaii Press. p. 517. ISBN 978-0-8248-0832-7. Note: scope broader than Hawaii.
- Gordon A. Macdonald; Douglass H. Hubbard (24 March 2006). "Volcanoes of the National Parks of Hawaii". National Park Service. Archived from the original on 4 November 2012.
