= Dave Phillips (maze designer) =

Dave Phillips (born May 7, 1951) is a maze and puzzle designer, and writer of The Zen Of The Labyrinth—Mazes For The Connoisseur. Phillips has provided puzzles for Reader's Digest, Highlights, National Geographic World, Die Zeit, Ranger Rick, Omni, Games, Scientific American, and United Features Syndicate. He has also created jigsaw puzzle mazes for Hallmark and die cut puzzle mazes for DaMert.

Phillips has designed and produced electronic puzzles and logic titles for CD-i, Smart Games, and eGames. He and partner Rob Hafey own eBrainyGames, an electronic game development company.

Since 2000, Phillips has partnered with Hugh McPherson of MaizeQuest, a corn maze company to design corn mazes, interactive games, and walk-through mazes (such as bamboo, hedge, and fence) for locations throughout the United States, Canada, and England.

Phillips and his family emigrated from England to Maryland in 1960 when he was nine years old. He became a naturalized citizen at 25. One year later he created his first book, Graphic and Op Art Mazes.
