= David K. Phillips =

American philosopher

David Phillips
- Awards: Henry Wilde Prize

Education
- Education: Cornell University (PhD), Lincoln College, Oxford University (BA)

Philosophical work
- Era: 21st-century philosophy
- Region: Western philosophy
- Institutions: University of Houston
- Main interests: ethics

David Phillips is an American philosopher and professor of philosophy at the University of Houston. He is known for his works on ethics.

== Books ==
- Sidgwick's The Methods of Ethics: A Guide, Oxford University Press 2022
- Rossian Ethics: W.D. Ross and Contemporary Moral Theory, Oxford University Press 2019
- Sidgwickian Ethics, Oxford University Press 2011
