= Christina Neal =

USGS volcanologist

Christina "Tina" Neal
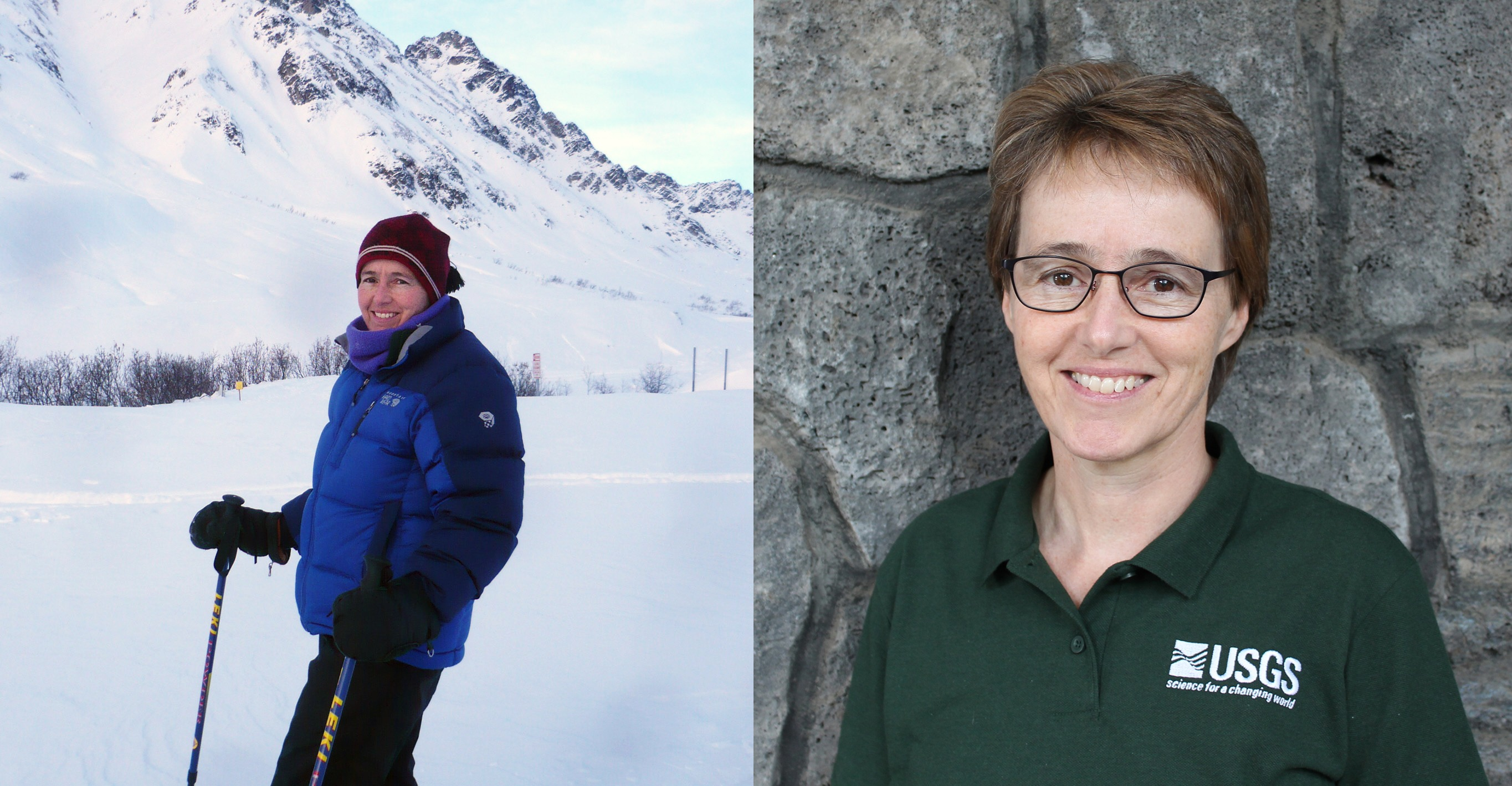
- Born: 1959 (age 66–67)

Academic background
- Education: Arizona State University; Brown University
- Website: www.usgs.gov/staff-profiles/christina-a-neal

Christina A. Neal (born 1959) is an American volcanologist and an honoree for a Samuel J. Heyman Service to America Medal. Neal was the Scientist-in-Charge at the Hawaiian Volcano Observatory from 2015 to 2020. Neal took over as the director of the U.S. Geological Survey (USGS) Volcano Science Center on May 9, 2021. Neal is a Fellow of the Geological Society of America.

== Education ==
Neal is a native of Connecticut, and graduated from Brown University in 1980 with a bachelor's degree in geological sciences. In 1986, she received a master's degree in geology from Arizona State University.

== Career ==
From 1983-1989, Neal worked for the U.S. Geological Survey at the Hawaiian Volcano Observatory. In 1990, she joined the newly established Alaska Volcano Observatory in Anchorage, Alaska, where she monitored eruptions in the Aleutian Arc and investigated the eruptive history and volcanic hazards along the Alaska Peninsula and eastern Aleutians. In 1998, Neal took a two-year posting at the United States Agency of International Development in Washington, D.C., as the first Geoscience Advisor to the Office of U.S. Foreign Disaster Assistance, where she reviewed hazard mitigation programs for several countries, including Thailand, Nepal, Ecuador, Colombia, and Kazakhstan, among others. She returned in 2000 to the Alaska Volcano Observatory as a staff geologist, mapping and studying active Alaskan volcanoes. On March 8, 2015, she became the scientist in charge at the Hawaiian Volcano Observatory, succeeding Jim Kauahikaua.

As Scientist-in-Charge, her position entailed directing emergency responses to volcanic events and making sure there were staff to man the observatory, among other tasks. During her tenure as Scientist-in-Charge, she was often a contact to the media about volcanic hazards and events in Hawaii.

In 2019, Neal and the Hawaiian Volcano Observatory team were a Science and Environment finalist for a Samuel J. Heyman Service to America Medal.

Neal became the director of the U.S. Geological Survey Volcano Science Center in 2021. Among her other duties, she manages the National Volcano Early Warning System.
