= James G. Moore =

American geologist, Penrose Medal winner (born 1930)

James "Jim" Moore
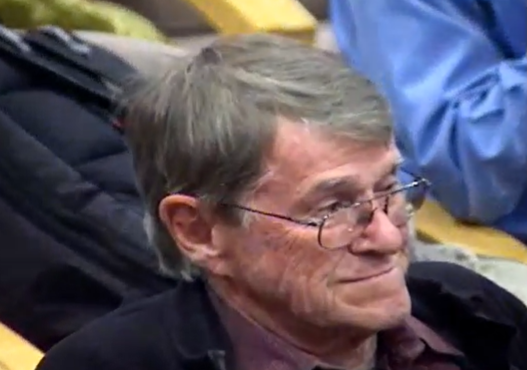
- Moore pictured in the audience of a U.S. Geological Survey event, 2015
- Born: James Gregory Moore; 30 April 1930; Palo Alto, California, U.S.
- Awards: Penrose Medal (GSA)

Academic background
- Education: § Education
- Website: www.usgs.gov/staff-profiles/james-g-moore

James Gregory Moore (born 30 April 1930, Palo Alto, California) is a geologist and winner of the 2020 Penrose Medal. Moore is a Scientist Emeritus for the U.S. Geological Survey.

== Education ==
- Stanford University (BS, 1951)
- University of Washington (MS, 1952)
- Johns Hopkins University (PhD, 1954)

== Career ==
James Moore has had a significant impact on the study of the structures of Hawaiian volcanoes. His studies in the field have contributed to the understanding that basaltic islands, like those in Hawaii, are susceptible a landslide or collapse, an event that could cause a tsunami. Accounts differ on when Moore served as Scientist-in-Charge of the Hawaiian Volcano Observatory. He was posted 1961 or 1962, and served until 1963 or 1964.

Moore was also one of the geologists on the scene of the eruption following the 1980 eruption of Mount St. Helens. He was crucial in determining the order of events leading up to, and following after the eruption and measuring the volumes of resulting landslides. He has also researched extensively in the Lassen area of California as well as in the Sierra Nevada.

== Books ==
Moore is also the author of 2 notable books, Exploring the Highest Sierra and King of the 40th Parallel.
