= David Phillips (sculptor) =

American sculptor

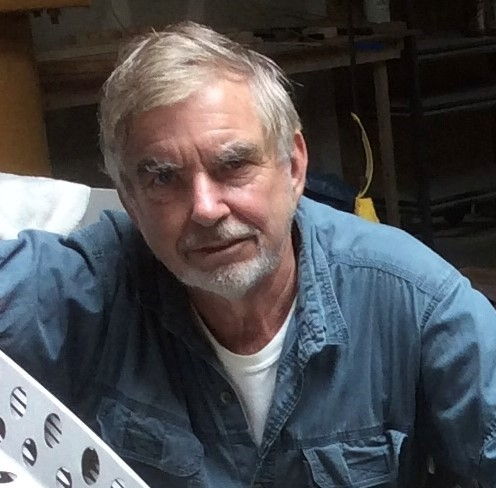
David Phillips, sculptor, in his studio, 2017

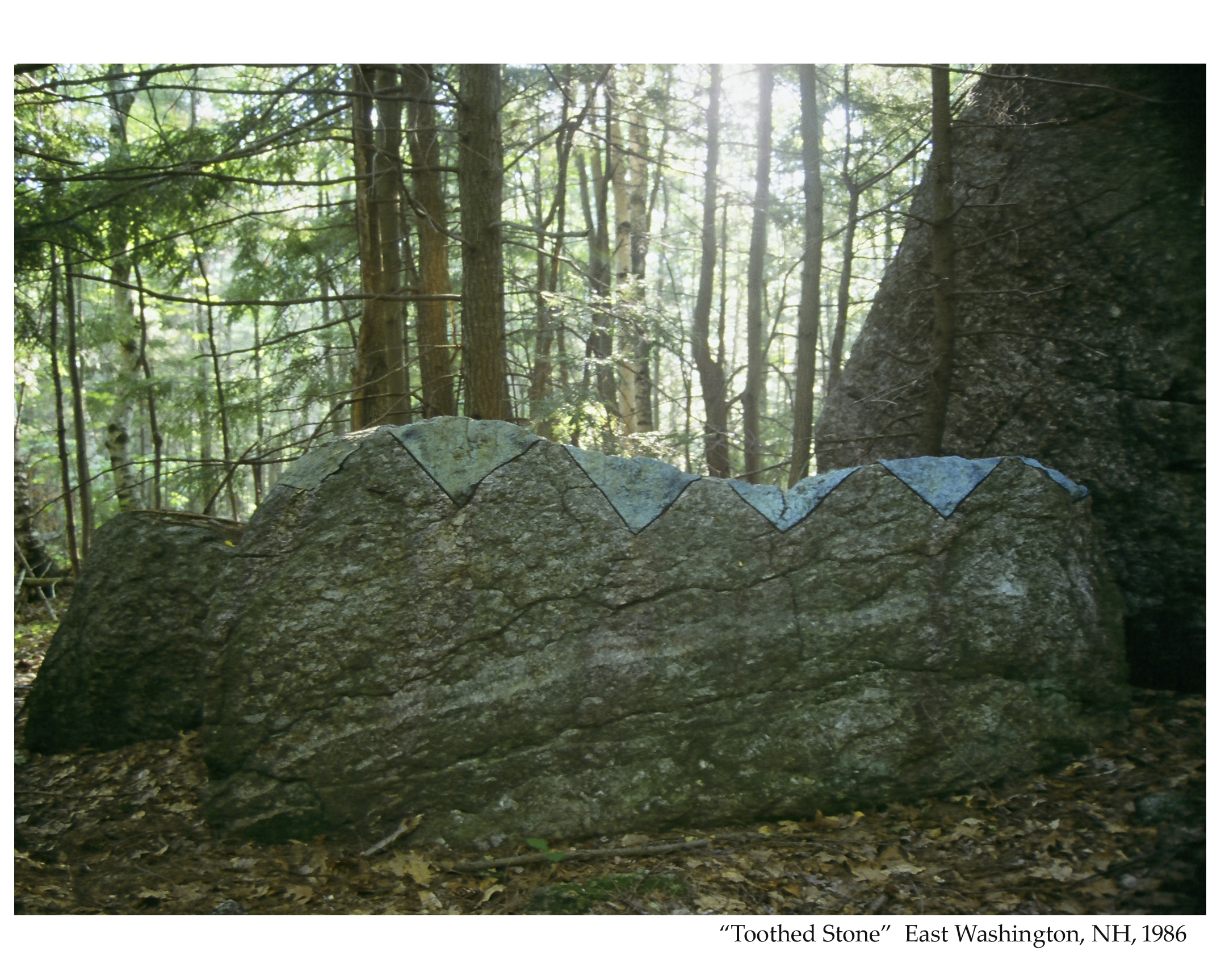
David Phillips sculpture New Hampshire forest: Toothed Stone 1986 field stone inlaid bronze

David L. Phillips (born January 8, 1944, in Flint, Michigan) is an American sculptor best known for his public artwork including large bronze sculptures. Phillips has been described as a "Sculptor to Nature" because his work often combines cut stones with bronze castings in a natural setting. He also made a half dozen sculptures spread over 50 acres of the forest in New Hampshire. They range from "Toothed Stone" to the delicate placing of bronze molded leaves atop a granite fieldstone and a boulder inlaid with a whimsical bronze face.

Another distinct feature of Phillips' work is his incorporation of playful bronze-cast animals, such as frogs, snails, fish, and turtles in public landscape and fountains in public parks, for which he has been working with landscape architects since the early 1990s.

== Education ==
Phillips earned a BFA in 1967 at Cranbrook Academy of Art where he majored in painting and minored in sculpture. He continued his studies at Cranbrook, receiving his MFA in 1969, where he studied bronze and iron casting under Julius Schmidt and ceramics with Richard DeVore.

== Selected Awards/Grants ==
In 1968 Phillips received a Charles Stewart Mott Foundation grant to study and travel in Europe. In 1985, sponsored by the United States Information Agency (USIA), Phillips traveled to Japan to exhibit his work in Nagoya and Tokyo. Other awards include a MacDowell (artists' residency and workshop) in 1977 and a Pollock-Krasner Foundation grant in 1999. Phillips obtained an award from Boston Landmarks Commission for the Dr. Melvin Lederman Vietnam War Memorial.

He also obtained an award from the National Parks to build the Spectacle Island Shelter located in the Boston Harbor Islands. This work is part of the Collections of the Boston Art Commission.

The Edward Ingersoll Browne Fund awarded Phillips a commission for a public sculpture in the Angell Memorial Park in downtown Boston.

Phillips also won, along with landscape architect Craig Halvorson, an award from the Cambridge Art Council's Public Art Program in 1997 to design a sculpture and park for Quincy Square.

== Museum collections/exhibitions ==
- Duxbury Art Complex Museum
- Addison Gallery of American Art
- "Book Arts: Conversations in Art and Works" at Cahoon Museum of American Art

== Selected Public Art ==
- "Frog Pond Playground" at Boston Common in Boston
- "Garden of Absence" in Kōfu, Japan
- "Fountain" at City Square Park in Charlestown, Massachusetts
- "Scrolls" at New England Conservatory of Music in Boston, MA (2017)
- "Megaliths" at Porter station in Cambridge, MA
- "Bread" at Riverside Press Park in Cambridge, MA
- "Trilith" at the Art Complex Museum in Duxbury, MA
- "The Seasons Table" at Utah Schools for the Deaf and the Blind, Utah State Public Art Collection, UT
- "Garden of Symbols" at Southern Utah University Library, Utah State Public Art Collection, UT
- "Common Ground" at University of Utah Talmage (Biology) Building, Utah State Public Art Collection, UT
- "Levitated Stone" at Cambridge, MA
- "Chords" at Eastport Park, Boston, MA
- "Beach Fragments" at Lechmere Canal, East Cambridge, MA
- "Dancing with the Spheres", at the Animal Rescue League of Boston, MA
- "Bronze Crabs" at Chelsea Square Park in Chelsea, MA
- "Water Strider fountain" located at Eastern Connecticut State University (1992)
- "Bridge" at the New England Conservatory of Music, on St Botolph Street, Boston, MA (2022)
