= 2022 eruption of Mauna Loa =

2022 volcano eruption in Hawaiʻi

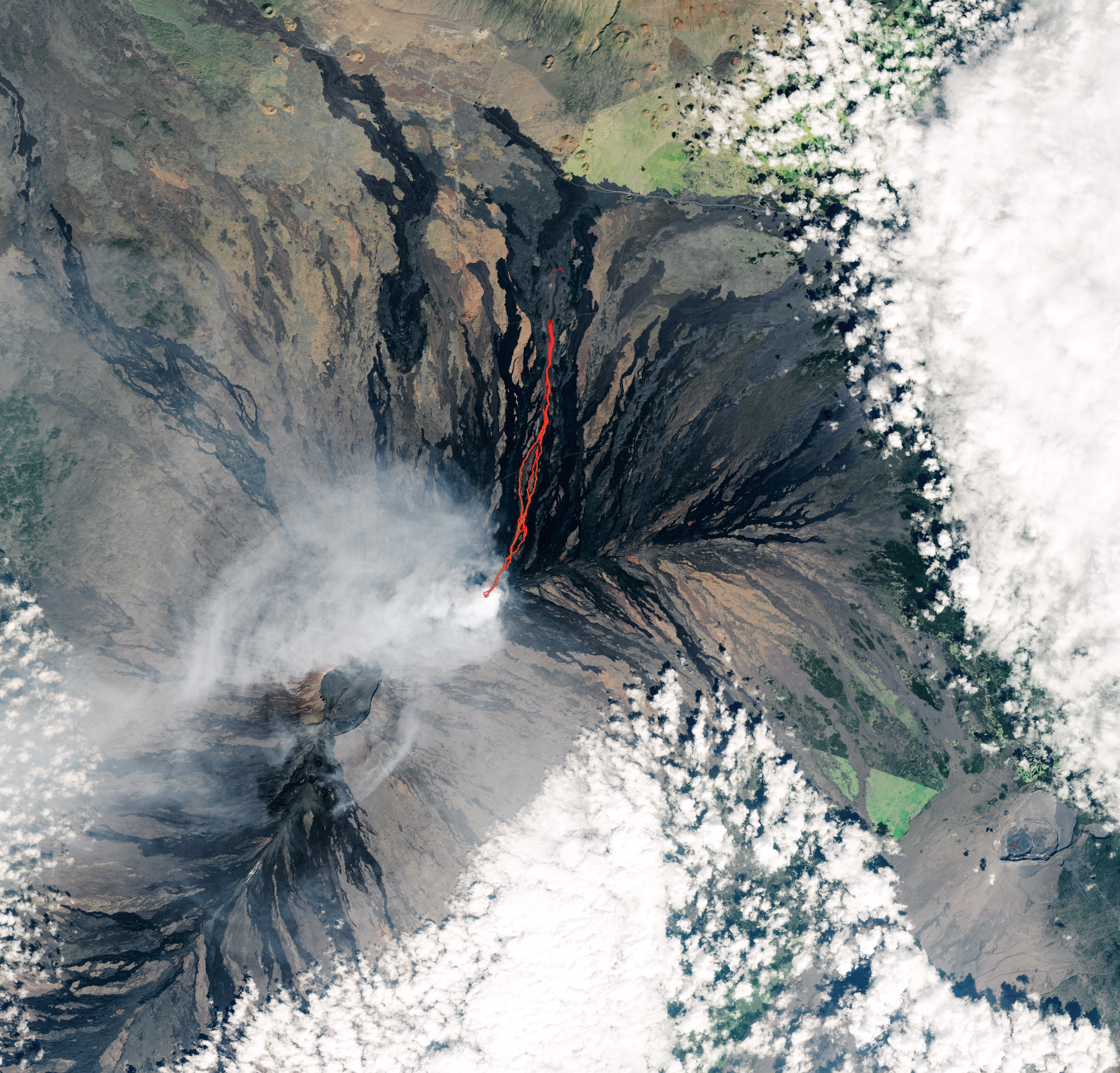
- Mauna Loa's eruption was captured by the Operational Land Imager-2 (OLI-2) on December 2.
- Volcano: Mauna Loa
- Start date: November 27, 2022
- Start time: 11:30 p.m. HST
- End date: December 10, 2022
- Type: Hawaiian, effusive
- Location: Pacific Ocean, Hawaiʻi; 19°28′46″N 155°36′10″W
- Volume: 0.2–0.25 km^{3} (0.048–0.060 mi^{3})
- VEI: 0
- Impact: No injuries or deaths, US$1.5m in estimated property damage

Maps
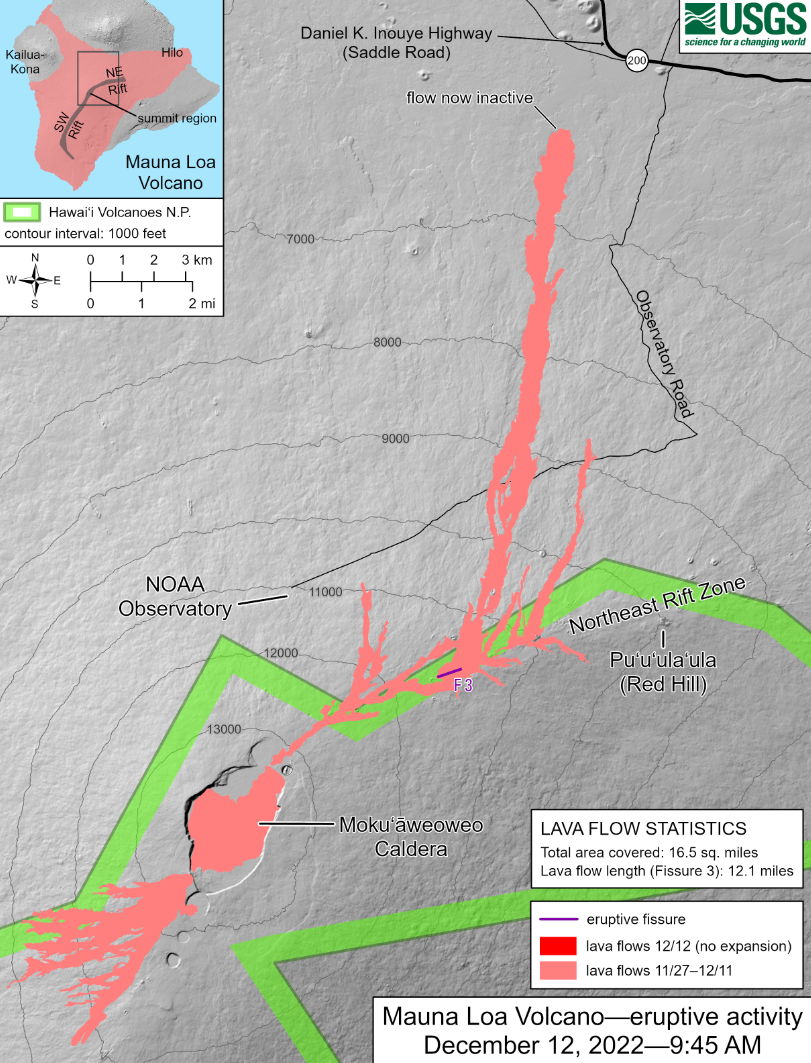
- USGS map of eruptive activity December 12, at 9:45 a.m.

The 2022 eruption of Mauna Loa was an episode of eruptive volcanic activity at Mauna Loa, the world's largest active volcano, located on Hawaiʻi Island, Hawaiʻi. Mauna Loa began to erupt shortly before midnight HST on November 27, 2022, when lava flows emerged from fissure vents in Moku‘āweoweo (Mauna Loa's summit caldera). It marked the first eruption at the volcano in 38 years. The eruption ended on December 10, 2022, after more than two weeks.

The eruption resulted in no recorded injuries or fatalities, and while it threatened equipment at Mauna Loa Observatory and the cross-island Saddle Road, it did not result in the major property damage caused by other Hawaiian eruptions such as the 2018 eruption at neighboring Kīlauea that destroyed 700 homes. The Hawaii County civil defense administrator called it "the best situation we could have asked for from Mauna Loa", and the scientist in charge of the Hawaiian Volcano Observatory called it his "favorite eruption".

== Context ==
Mauna Loa is a massive shield volcano that covers half of the island of Hawaiʻi and rises to an elevation of 13,679 feet (4,169 m) above sea level, only slightly shorter than nearby Mauna Kea. When active, Mauna Loa tends to produce "voluminous, fast-moving lava flows" of the Hawaiian or effusive eruption type rather than more explosive phreatic or Plinian eruptions, though it has produced explosive eruptions between 300 and 1,000 years ago.

Before 2022, Mauna Loa had last erupted in March 1984, in a 22-day event similarly concentrated in the volcano's Northeast Rift Zone. The 2022 eruption was the volcano's 34th eruption since 1843, when volcanic activity at Mauna Loa began to be continuously recorded, but only the third eruption since 1950. The 38-year span between the 1984 and 2022 eruptions was Mauna Loa's longest period of quiescence on record.

== Eruption ==
=== Activity increases ===
In mid-September, the United States Geological Survey (USGS) recorded an increase in earthquakes beneath Moku‘āweoweo and to its northwest. The number of quakes rose from 10-20 per day to 40-50 per day, triggered by magma moving into Mauna Loa's summit reservoirs. On October 5, prompted by the elevated seismic activity, the National Park Service closed Mauna Loa's summit and backcountry, which lie within Hawai'i Volcanoes National Park and are normally accessible on foot. In early October the Hawaiian Volcano Observatory (HVO) began issuing daily activity updates instead of weekly. After 36 minor earthquakes were detected near Mauna Loa on October 28–29, the Hawaii County Civil Defense Agency (HCCDA) issued a volcano advisory that warned of a "state of heightened unrest" but noted that there were still no signs of an imminent eruption.

=== Eruption begins ===
Video showing thermal imagery from a Mauna Loa webcam on November 28

The eruption began at 11:30 p.m. HST on November 27. Immediately after the eruption began, the Hawaiian Volcano Observatory raised the volcano alert level from Advisory to Warning and the aviation color code from Yellow to Red. Active vents were initially confined to the caldera. Three hours after the eruption began, lava flows at the summit could be observed from Kailua-Kona. The eruption remained confined to the caldera until approximately 6:30 a.m. on November 28, when it migrated from the summit to the Northeast Rift Zone with fissures feeding new lava flows.

Three fissures initially erupted on the Northeast Rift Zone, with only the lowest fissure still active as of 1:30 p.m. HST on November 28. Lava fountains also began erupting along the fissures. Most were a few meters tall, but the tallest were 100–200 feet (30–60 m) in height. A fourth fissure began erupting at approximately 7:30 p.m. HST on November 28. Lava flows also emanated from the four fissures. While flows from the two higher fissures stopped approximately 11 miles (18 km) from Saddle Road, flows from the third fissure continue to move and were located approximately 4.5 miles (7.2 km) from Saddle Road at 3:30 PM on November 29. An ongoing earthquake swarm started at 2:25 p.m. HST, with the largest earthquake measuring a magnitude (M_{L}) of 4.2. As of November 30, at least 249 earthquakes above 1.2 in magnitude were recorded by USGS. Sulfur dioxide (SO_{2}) emissions measured approximately 250,000 tonnes (280,000 short tons) per day on November 28, which dropped to 180,000 t (200,000 short tons) per day by December 1, and to 120,000 t (130,000 short tons) per day by December 4. Tremors were detected by the seismic monitoring in the vicinity of the then-active fissures.

Spectators often noted vortices or whirlwinds near the lava flows that some speculated were small tornadoes, but the National Weather Service determined they were a kind of dust devil caused by strong surface heating from the lava that had occurred during previous Hawaiian eruptions.

=== Eruption ends ===
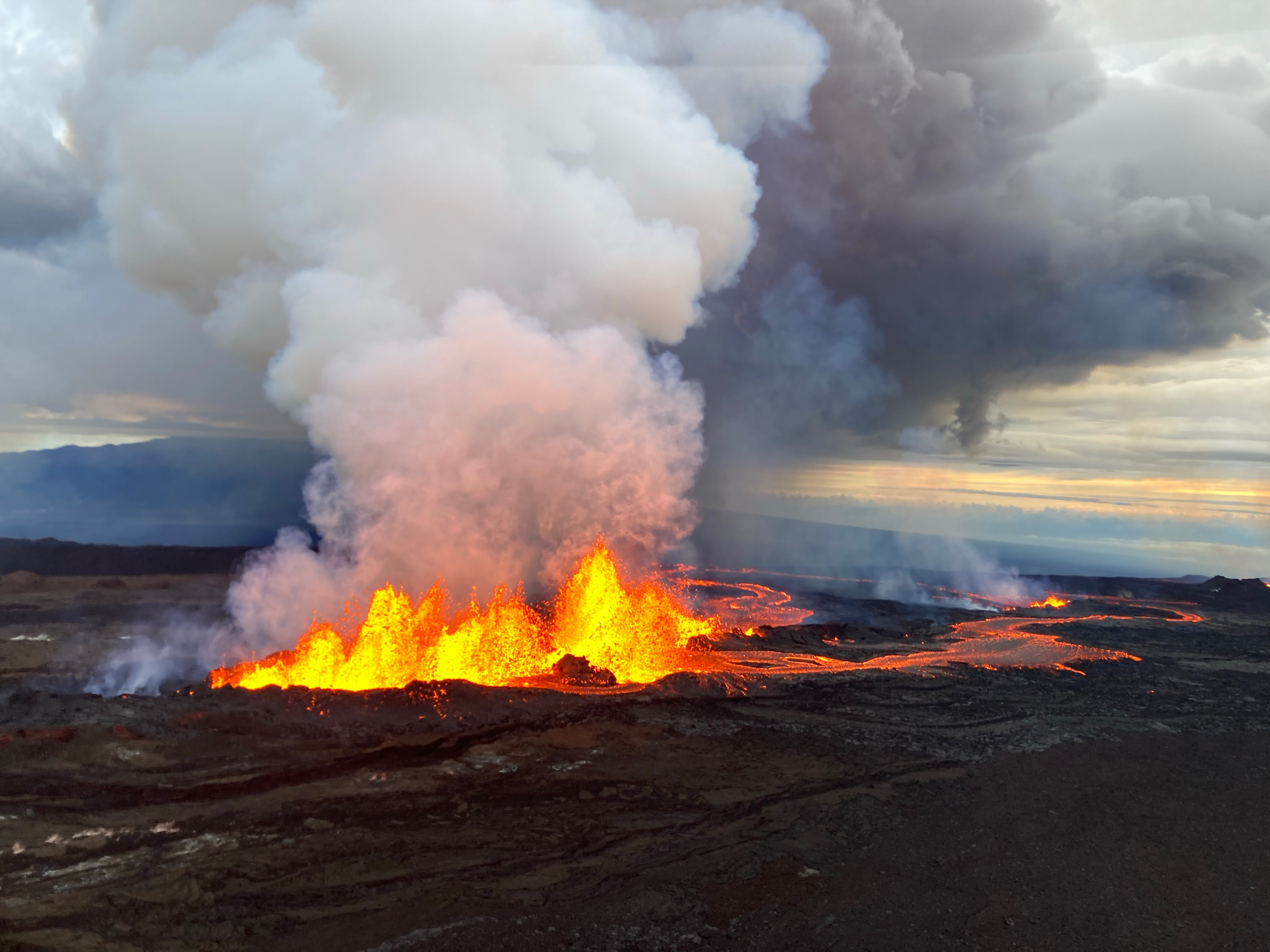
Fissures and lava flows on Mauna Loa's Northeast Rift Zone on November 29

The Mauna Loa eruption ended on December 10, 2022, when the supply of lava to the fissure 3 vent cut off. By December 13, the Hawaiian Volcano Observatory had reduced the volcano alert level to Advisory, where it had been immediately prior to the eruption.

Lava traveled 16 miles (26 km) from the eruption site, stopping 1.7 miles (2.7 km) from Saddle Road. Scientists estimate that 200–250 million cubic meters (260–330 million cubic yards) of lava flowed from the volcano over the first 12 days of the eruption, a higher-than-normal amount, but they also noted that the 2022 eruption was on par with the duration of Mauna Loa's previous eruptions. The total volume of lava emitted was less than a quarter of that released during Kīlauea's 2018 eruption.

==== Kīlauea's eruption ends ====
The December 12 cessation of Mauna Loa's eruption occurred alongside a pause in Kīlauea's eruption, which had been ongoing at a low level since September 29, 2021, and which emitted more than 29 billion U.S. gal (110 billion L) of lava. Scientists said that the link between the simultaneous decreases in activity at the neighboring volcanos was "surprising and thought-provoking" but unclear, and might be a coincidence, though previous correlations in their behavior had been observed. Kīlauea resumed erupting on January 5, 2023.

== Impacts ==
=== Hazards ===
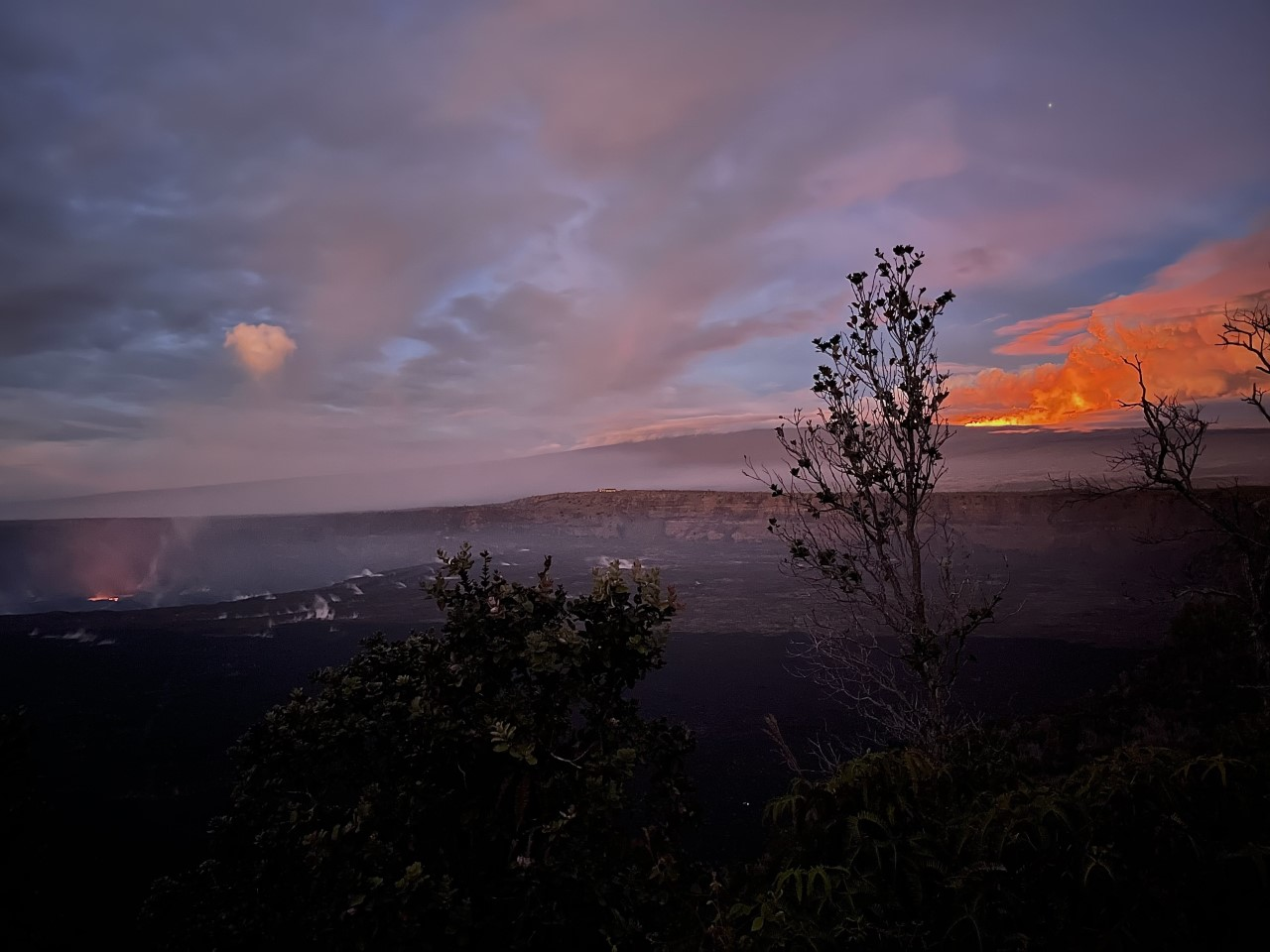
Kīlauea (lower left) and Mauna Loa (upper right) erupting simultaneously on November 28

Lava flows did not threaten downslope communities, and the eruption remained confined to the Northeast Rift Zone, but USGS cautioned that gases, volcanic ash, and thin strands of volcanic glass known as Pele's hair might be carried downwind of the eruption. Pele's hair was reported as far away as the community of Laupāhoehoe. The National Weather Service (NWS) issued an ashfall advisory through 22:00 HST on November 28, warning that up to a quarter-inch of ash could accumulate in some parts of the island.

The Hawaii Department of Transportation issued a travel advisory on the 28th, and Southwest Airlines canceled up to 10 inter-island flights between Hilo International Airport and Daniel K. Inouye International Airport in Honolulu, though Hawaiian Airlines continued to operate. The Hawaii Department of Health advised the public to stay inside and close doors and windows. Hawaii Governor David Ige issued an emergency proclamation in response to the eruption in order to "allow responders to respond quickly or limit access, if necessary".

=== Closures, scientific impacts, and damage ===
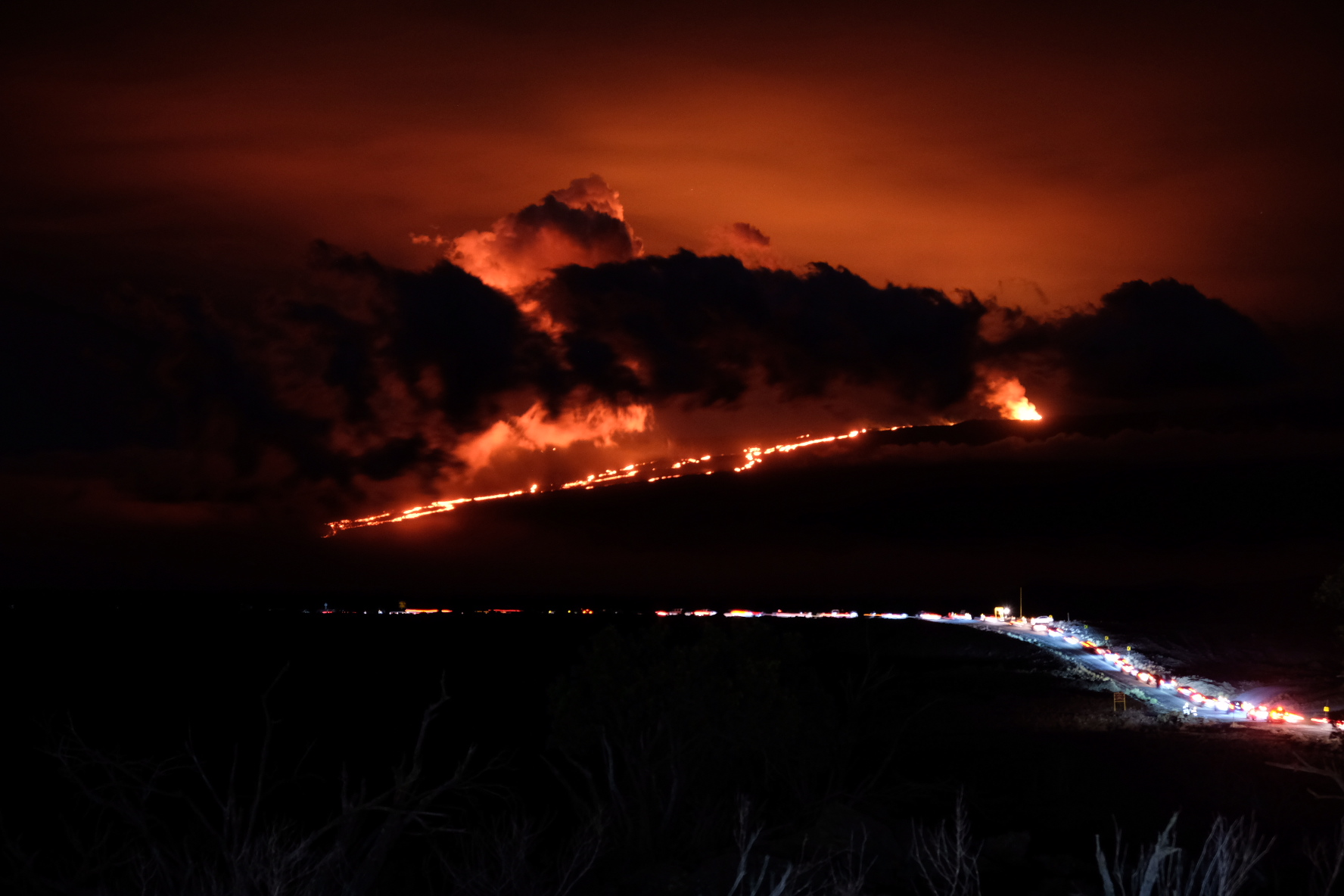
Traffic is visible on Saddle Road as Mauna Loa erupts in the background

On the evening of November 28, a lava flow from the third fissure crossed the road leading to the Mauna Loa Observatory, disrupting power and access to the facility. This disruption has halted observations taken by carbon dioxide (CO_{2}) measurement equipment that produces the famous Keeling Curve, a graph of CO_{2} accumulation in the atmosphere often used to show the role of human greenhouse gas emissions in climate change. Dr. Ralph Keeling, the scientist in charge of the program, said in early December that it would likely be at least several months before the equipment is restarted, and NOAA considered flying in a generator by helicopter in the meantime. Various other locations were scouted to provide replacement data, such as Haleakalā on the island of Maui. NOAA and the University of Hawaii eventually signed an emergency agreement to have the UH88 facility on Mauna Kea provide the missing atmospheric data until the Mauna Loa Observatory returns to operations. However, the eruption was expected to provide a wealth of scientific data, including lava samples, given the increased quality and quantity of instrumentation installed at Mauna Loa since the 1984 eruption.

The Hawaii Department of Transportation announced a plan to close Hawaii Route 200, also known as the Daniel K. Inouye Highway or Saddle Road, between mile markers 8.8 and 21 should lava threaten the highway. As lava approached the highway on December 5, Governor Ige activated 20 members of the Hawai'i National Guard to assist with traffic control, among other eruption-related duties. The lava flows ended up traveling 16 miles, stopping 1.7 miles short of Saddle Road. After the eruption, the Hawaii Emergency Management Agency (HI-EMA) estimated the cost of damage to private infrastructure at $1.5 million. The cost of traffic enforcement and establishment of a viewing area came to $600,000.

In the first week of 2023, a joint team from HI-EMA and the Federal Emergency Management Agency (FEMA) came to the island to assess damage to infrastructure. The assessment will be delivered to Governor Josh Green, who may use it to request a federal disaster declaration, allowing the state of Hawaii to recoup many eruption-related expenses from the federal government.

=== Cultural & tourism ===
The eruption, which began on Hawaiian Independence Day (in Hawaiian, Lā Kūʻokoʻa), was an event of cultural and spiritual significance for many Native Hawaiians. Mauna Loa's activity drew many visitors to the island, resulting in increased business for hotels, helicopter tourism agencies, and other businesses. During the first days of the eruption, thousands of spectators clogged Saddle Road before the government moved to restrict access for emergency responders as needed. An estimated 100,000 people used the newly-established viewing area over the two weeks of the eruption.

The eruption almost interrupted the final phase of filming Apple TV+'s period drama Chief of War taking place in Kalapana.

== Gallery ==
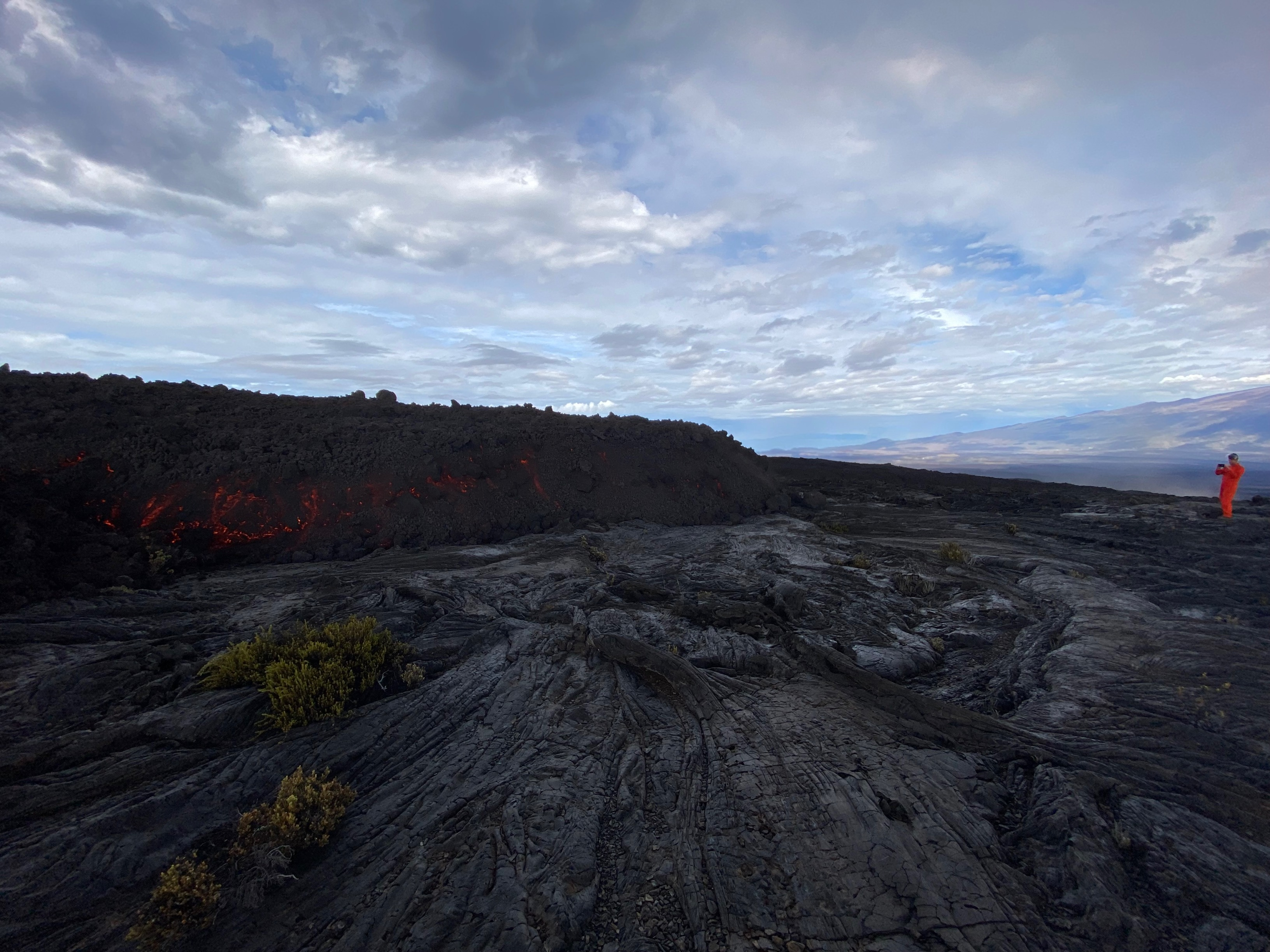
A lava flow from the Northeast Rift Zone of Mauna Loa

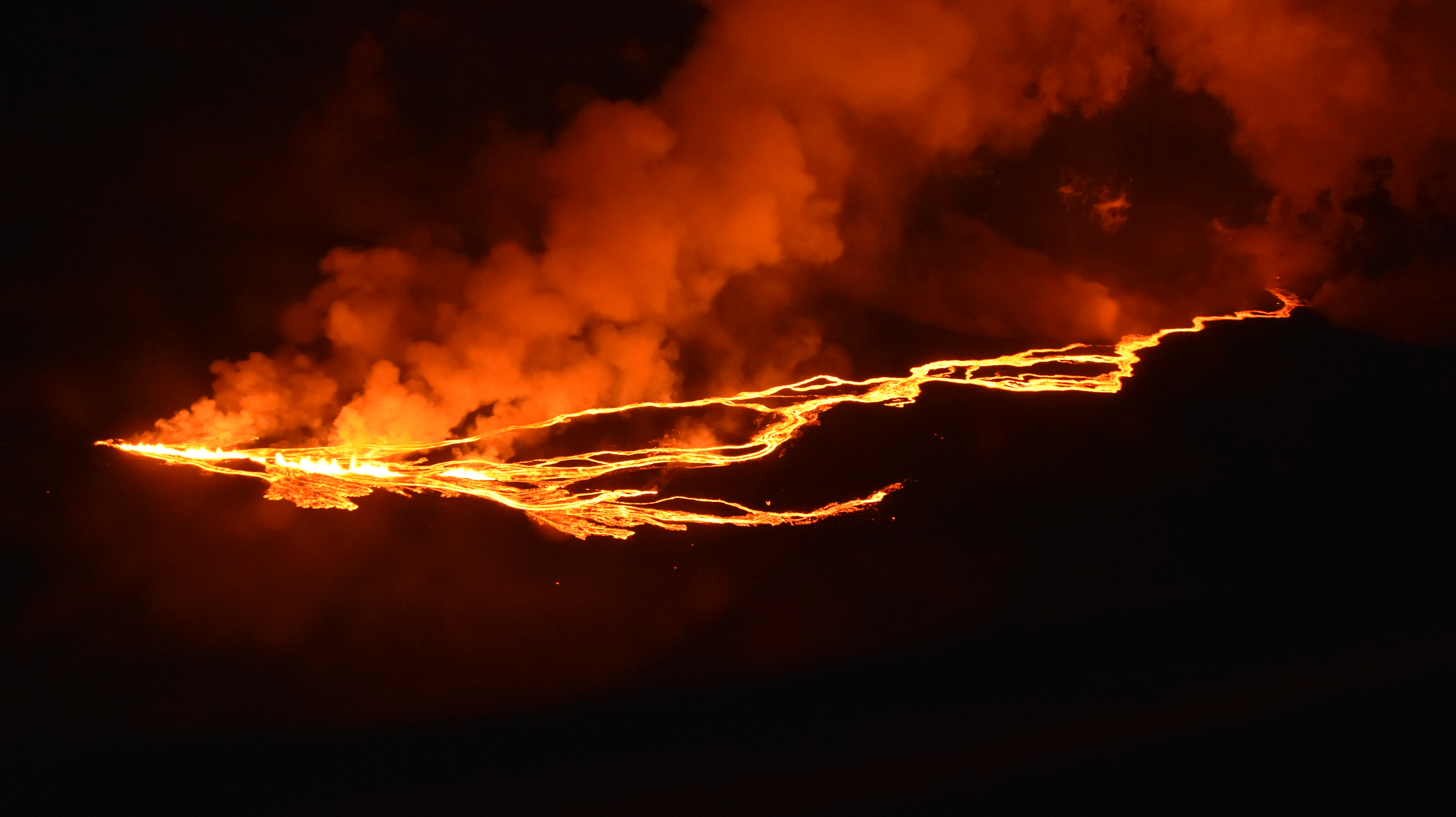
Aerial photo of an erupting fissure during the 2022 eruption of Mauna Loa

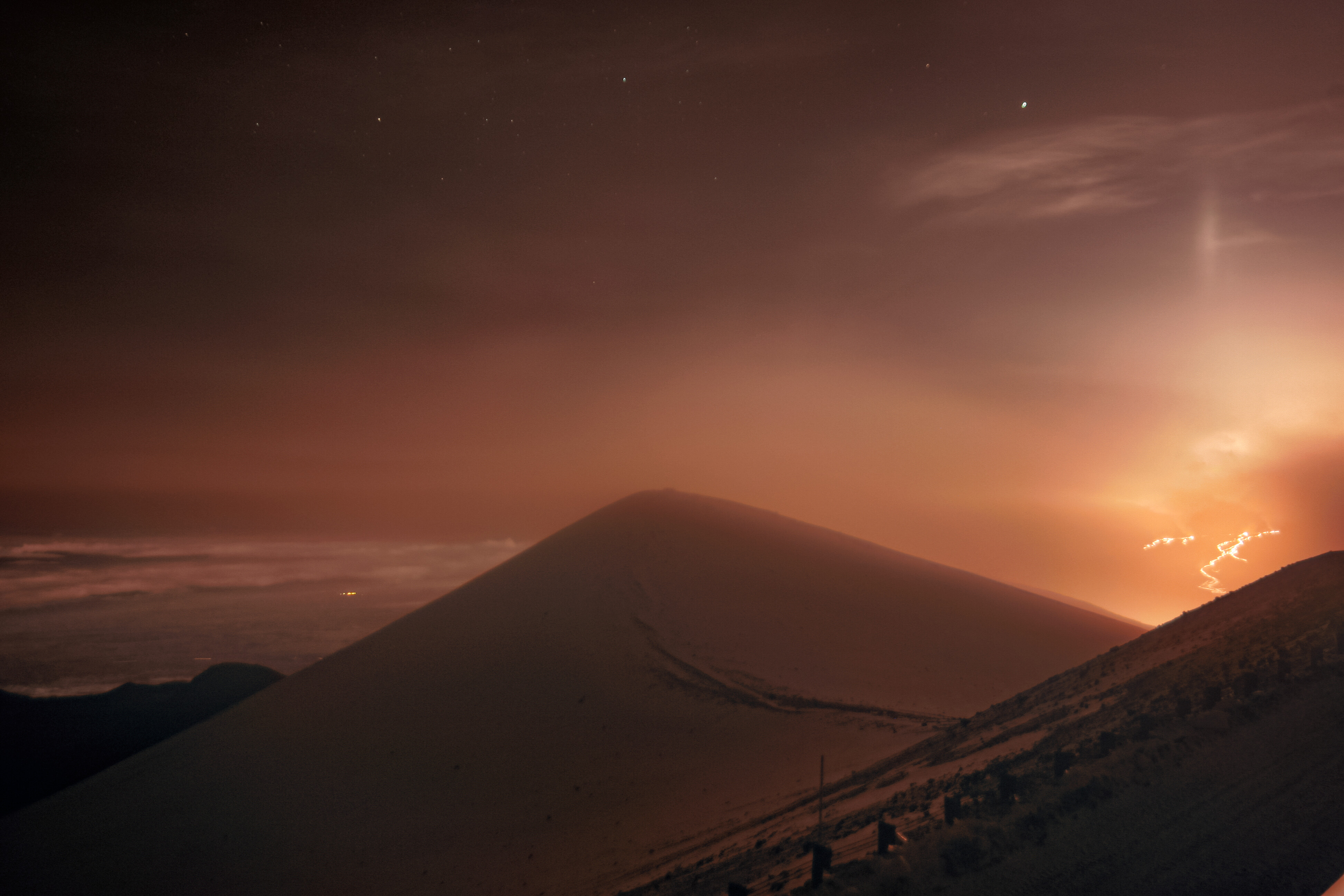
Mauna Loa lava flows and a light pillar seen from the Gemini North Observatory
