= 1984 eruption of Mauna Loa =

Volcanic eruption in Hawaii

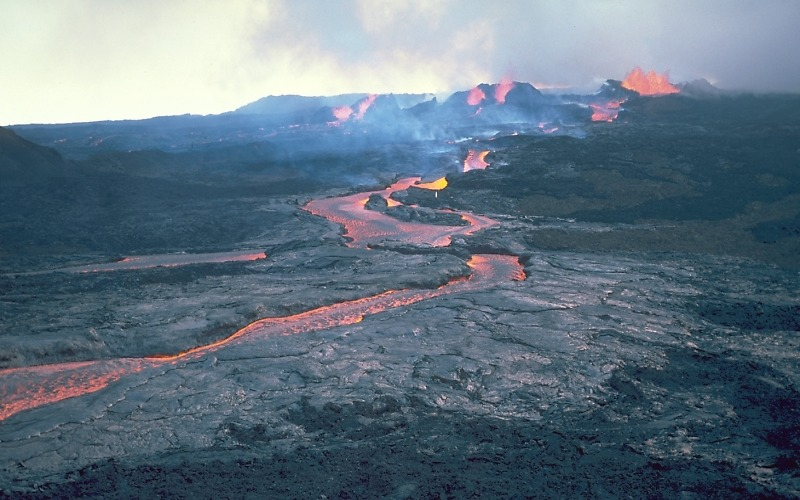
- Lava fountains and a'a channel flow during the 1984 eruption
- Volcano: Mauna Loa
- Start date: March 25, 1984
- Start time: 1:30 a.m. HST
- End date: April 15, 1984
- Type: Hawaiian
- Location: Hawaii, Hawaiian Islands; 19°28′03″N 155°35′29″W
- Volume: 0.043–0.060 cu mi (0.18–0.25 km^{3})
- VEI: 0
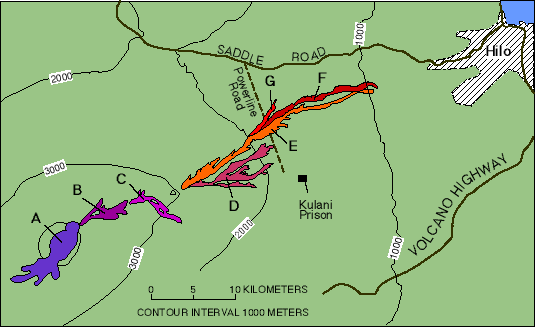
- Map showing areas covered by ‘a‘ā lava flows during the 1984 eruption of Mauna Loa

The 1984 eruption of Mauna Loa was a Hawaiian eruption in the U.S. state of Hawaii that lasted from March 25 to April 15, 1984. It ended a 9-year period of quiescence at the volcano and continued for 22 days, during which time lava flows and lava fountains issued from the summit caldera and fissures along the northeast and southwest rift zones. Although the lava threatened Hilo, the flow stopped before reaching the outskirts of town.

== Precursors ==
Repeated deformation measurements showed that the summit area of Mauna Loa began to inflate shortly after a brief summit eruption on July 5–6, 1975. This was followed by a 3-year period of slowly increasing earthquake activity beneath the volcano that included a swarm of earthquakes 3 to 9 mi (4.8 to 14.5 km) deep in mid-September 1983. The earthquakes reached a maximum frequency just after a 6.6 magnitude earthquake took place beneath the southeast flank of Mauna Loa, in the Ka‘ōiki fault system, on November 16, 1983. Following the Ka‘ōiki earthquake, the number of earthquakes over 1.5 magnitude increased gradually as the time of eruption approached.

The immediate precursors to the 1984 eruption consisted of an abrupt increase in small earthquakes and volcanic tremor recorded on seismic stations located near Moku‘āweoweo caldera. At 10:55 p.m. on March 24, small earthquakes began at a rate of 2–3 per minute. By 11:30 p.m., the seismic background increased, marking the onset of tremor. Just before 1:00 a.m. on March 25, the tremor amplitude increased to the point that the astronomical telescopes on Mauna Kea, 25 mi (40 km) to the northwest, could not be stabilized due to the constant ground vibration.

== Eruption ==
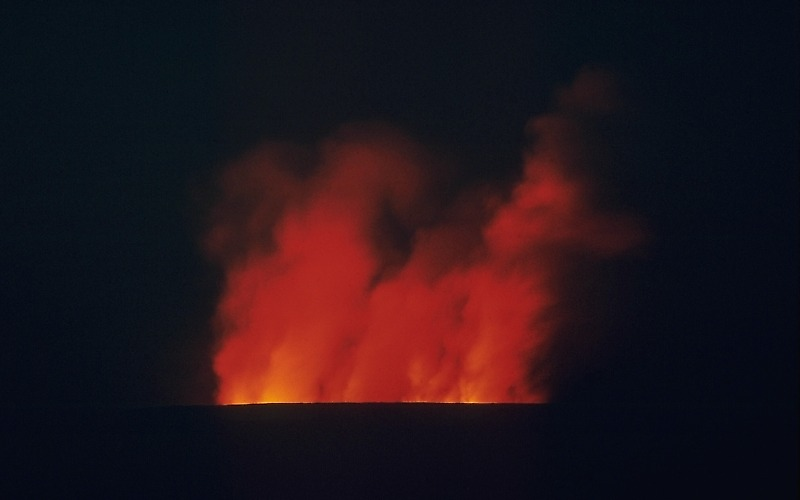
Night time view of the 1984 eruption

At 1:25 a.m., a military satellite recorded a strong infrared signal from the summit of Mauna Loa, indicating that the eruption was underway. Within just a few minutes, people throughout Hawaii island were reporting an intense red glow above the volcano. Eruptive fissures migrated rapidly down the southwest rift zone to the 12,750 ft (3,890 m) elevation and across the southern half of Moku‘āweoweo (flow A on map). By 4:00 a.m., lava fountains extended across the northeast half of Moku‘āweoweo and into the upper reaches of the northeast rift zone (flow B on map).

At 10:30 a.m., intense steam emissions began along a fracture 0.6 mi (0.97 km) long farther down the northeast rift zone between the 10,690 and 10,400 ft (3,260 and 3,170 m) elevation, but no eruptive fissure formed in this area. By mid-afternoon, eruptive activity began to decrease at the uppermost vents between 12,140 and 12,400 ft (3,700 and 3,780 m).

At 4:41 p.m., a new fissure opened up at the 9,350 ft (2,850 m) elevation. This fissure rapidly migrated both uprift and downrift, so that by 6:30 p.m., a line of lava fountains slightly longer than 1 mi (1.6 km) was active. Eventually the fissure system condensed to four centers of activity with fountains up to 50 m (165 ft) high. Four parallel flows (flows D on map) moved down the northeast flank at speeds as fast as 300 to 700 ft (91 to 213 m) per hour. All vents uprift from these new ones quickly became inactive and the eruptive activity was confined to these vents for the next three weeks. Six large vent structures eventually formed in this area around the active vents. By daybreak on March 26, these vents were feeding lava to a fast-moving flow (flow E on map) that had advanced 5.5 mi (8.9 km) to the northeast and three less active, shorter flows (flows D on map) that were advancing east toward Kulani Prison. The prison was put on alert because the shorter lava flows were as close as 2 mi (3.2 km) to the prison. These flows, however, stopped advancing within 48 hours and never crossed the Powerline Road.

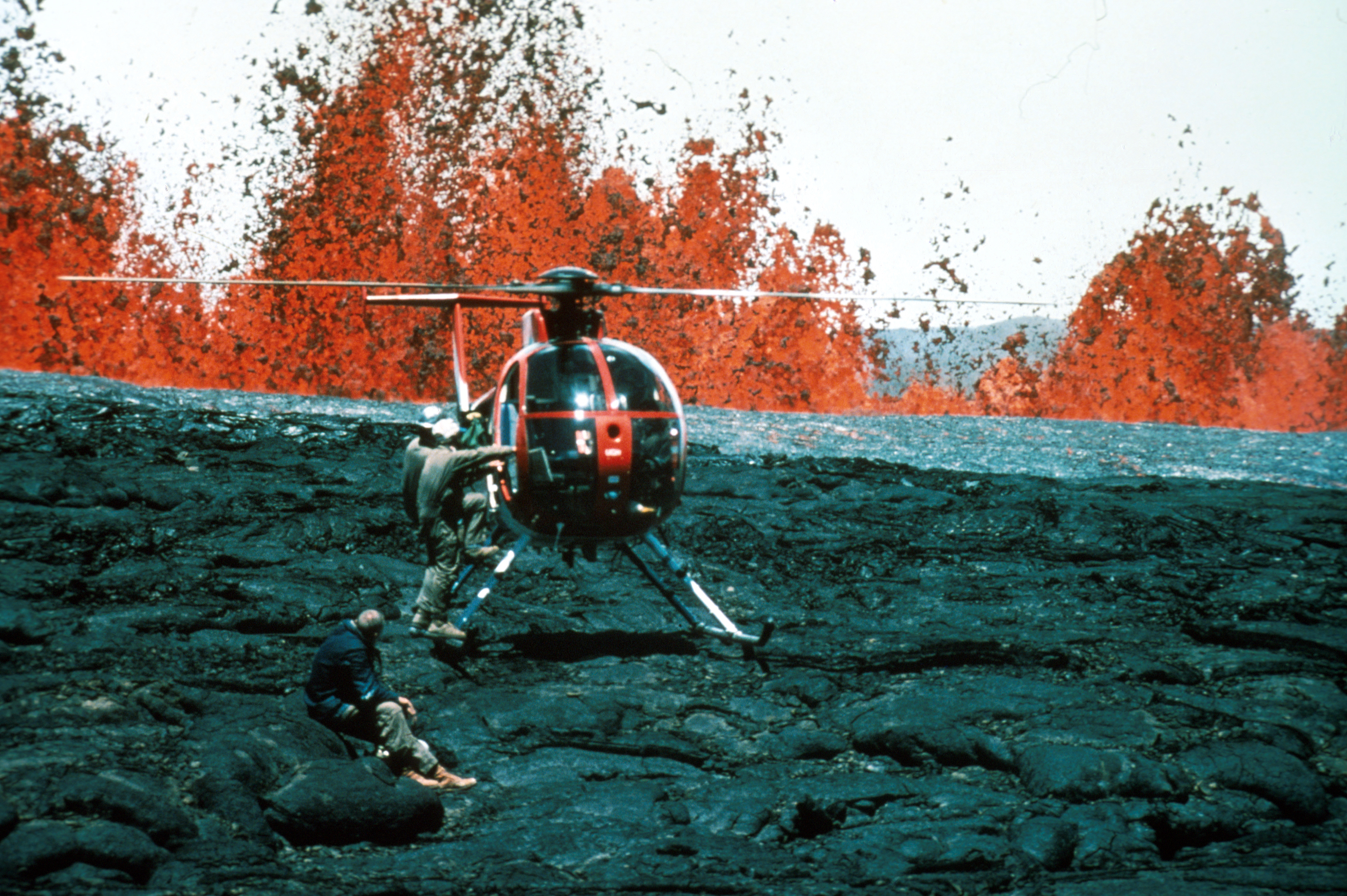
Hawaiian Volcano Observatory geologists board a helicopter as large lava fountains erupt in the background during the 1984 eruption. Helicopters provided access to remote areas of the eruption and were essential for safety.

The fast-moving flow (flow E on map) advanced as a relatively narrow, channelized ‘a‘ā lava flow. Its rate of advance slowed as it moved downslope, but by March 29 the flow had moved 15.5 mi (24.9 km) to an elevation of 3,000 ft (910 m). At this time, the flow front was about 4 mi (6.4 km) from the outskirts of Hilo. Smoke from burning vegetation, loud explosions caused by methane gas along the advancing flow front and the intense glow at night all contributed to a growing concern among Hilo's residents.

Early in the morning of March 29, a levee along the lava channel broke at the 1,737 m (5,699 ft) elevation about 8 mi (13 km) upslope from the flow front (flow E on map). The lava was diverted into a new subparallel flow (flow F on map) and flow E stagnated, temporarily relieving emergency-response officials and residents of Hilo. This new ‘a‘ā lava flow moved at a comparable rate to the earlier flow E, yet did not extend beyond flow E until April 4.

Another significant levee breakout occurred on April 5, forming a third subparallel ‘a‘ā lava flow (flow G on map) that moved downslope. Concurrently, lava output at the source vents diminished slightly, and the lava became more viscous, resulting in channel blockages and levee collapses that occurred more frequently. The collapses restricted the supply of lava to the flow fronts, which moved steadily higher and more distant from the outskirts of Hilo. By April 14, no active ‘a‘ā lava flows extended more than 1.25 mi (2.01 km) from the vents, and on April 15, the eruption ended.
