= Mauna Loa =

Volcano in Hawaii, United States

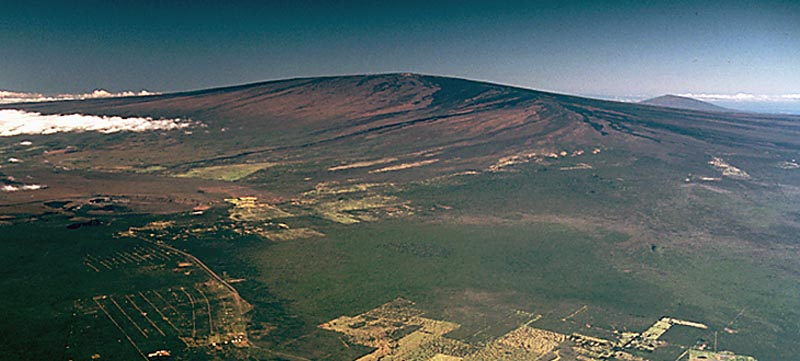
- Mauna Loa as seen from the air. Hualālai is visible in the background.

Highest point
- Elevation: 13,679 ft (4,169 m)
- Prominence: 7,079 ft (2,158 m)
- Listing: US highest major peaks 66th; US most prominent peaks 38th; Hawaii highest major peaks 2nd
- Coordinates: 19°28′46″N 155°36′10″W

Geography
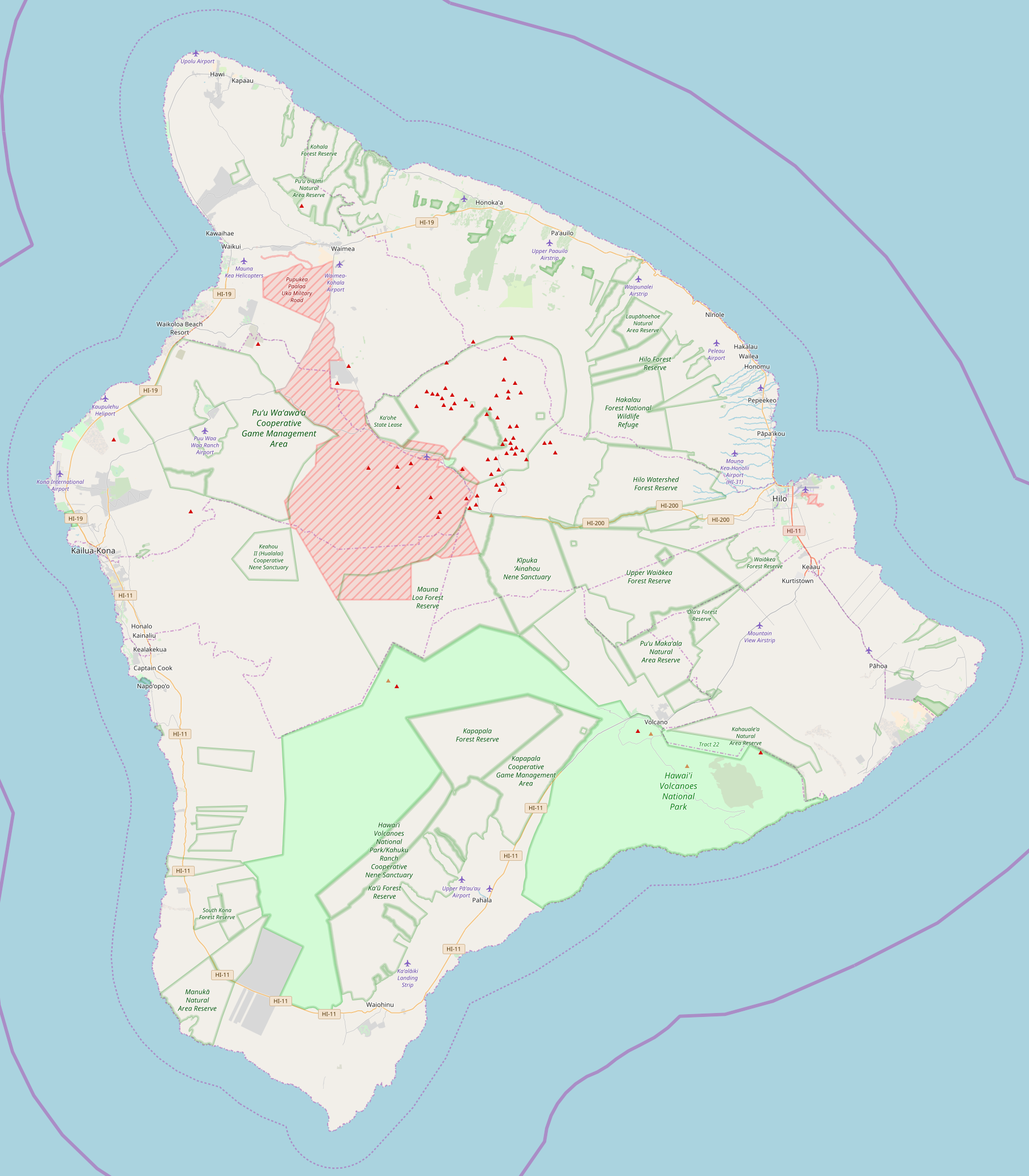
- Location within Hawaii (island) Location within Hawaii
- Location: Hawaii, U.S.
- Parent range: Hawaiian Islands
- Topo map: USGS Mauna Loa

Geology
- Rock age: 700,000–1 million
- Mountain type: Shield volcano
- Volcanic zone: Hawaiian-Emperor seamount chain
- Last eruption: November 27 – December 13, 2022

Climbing
- First ascent: Ancient times
- Easiest route: Ainapo Trail

Mauna Loa (/ˌmɔːnə ˈloʊ.ə, ˌmaʊnə -/, Hawaiian: [ˈmɐwnə ˈlowə]; lit. 'Long Mountain') is one of five volcanoes that form the Island of Hawaii in the U.S. state of Hawaii in the Pacific Ocean. Mauna Loa is Earth's largest active volcano by both mass and volume. It was historically considered to be the largest volcano on Earth until the submarine mountain Tamu Massif was discovered to be larger. Mauna Loa is a shield volcano with relatively gentle slopes, and a volume estimated at 18,000 cubic miles (75,000 km^{3}), although its peak is about 125 feet (38 m) lower than that of its neighbor, Mauna Kea. Lava eruptions from Mauna Loa are silica-poor and very fluid, and tend to be non-explosive.

Ancient Hawaiians arrived to the island bringing various changes to the ecosystem. Hunting resulted in the extinction of some bird species, but the Ancient Hawaiians also introduced various plant and animal species, changing the erosion rates of the land. Many religious and traditions beliefs connected the people to the volcanoes. Mauna Loa being the largest of the five volcanoes was admired greatly. While many stories and folklore of Gods and Goddesses like Pele still exist today, it has become less practiced by Native Hawaiians.

Mauna Loa has likely been erupting for at least 700,000 years, and may have emerged above sea level about 400,000 years ago. Some dated rocks are 470,000 years old. The volcano's magma comes from the Hawaii hotspot, which has been responsible for the creation of the Hawaiian Island chain over tens of millions of years. The slow drift of the Pacific Plate will eventually carry Mauna Loa away from the hotspot within 500,000 to one million years from now, at which point it will become extinct.

Mauna Loa's most recent eruption began on November 27, 2022, and ended on December 13 of that year. It was the first eruption since 1984. No recent eruptions of the volcano have caused fatalities, but eruptions in 1926 and 1950 destroyed villages, and the city of Hilo is partly built on lava flows from the late 19th century.

Because of the potential hazards it poses to population centers, Mauna Loa is part of the Decade Volcanoes program, which encourages studies of the world's most dangerous volcanoes. Mauna Loa has been monitored intensively by the Hawaiian Volcano Observatory since 1912. Observations of the atmosphere are undertaken at the Mauna Loa Observatory, and of the Sun at the Mauna Loa Solar Observatory, both located near the mountain's summit. Hawaii Volcanoes National Park covers the summit and portions of the southeastern and southwestern flanks of the volcano, and also incorporates Kīlauea, a separate volcano.

The volcano continues to be researched and observed today through the help of Thomas A. Jaggar, founder of the Hawaiian Volcano Observatory (HVO) in 1912. With the assistance of the Buffalo Soldiers in 1915, a path to the top of Mauna Loa was created. Many of the roads and routes used then are still used today to allow for easier access from researchers and scientists.

== Geology ==
=== Setting ===
Position of Mauna Loa on Hawaiʻi island

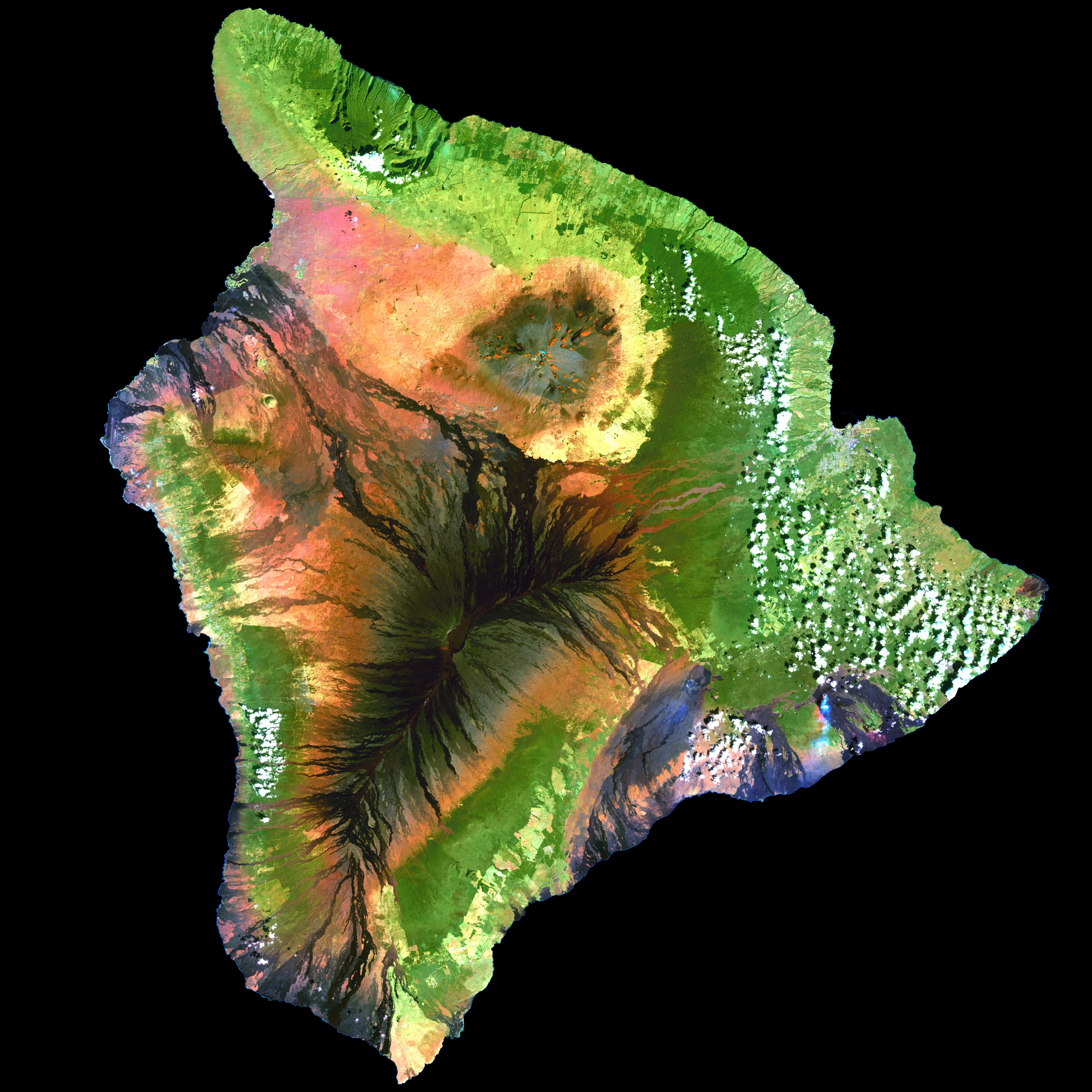
Landsat mosaic; recent lava flows appear in black

Like all Hawaiian volcanoes, Mauna Loa was created as the Pacific tectonic plate moved over the Hawaii hotspot in the Earth's underlying mantle. The Hawaii island volcanoes are the most recent evidence of this process that, over 70 million years, has created the 3,700 mi (6,000 km)-long Hawaiian–Emperor seamount chain. The prevailing view states that the hotspot has been largely stationary within the planet's mantle for much, if not all of the Cenozoic Era. However, while the Hawaiian mantle plume is well understood and extensively studied, the nature of hotspots themselves remains fairly enigmatic.

Mauna Loa is one of five subaerial (Note: occurring on or near the Earth's land surface as opposed to submarine (below the sea), sub-glacial (below a glacier), etc.) volcanoes that make up the island of Hawaiʻi. The oldest volcano on the island, Kohala, is more than a million years old, and Kīlauea, the youngest, is believed to be between 210,000 and 280,000 years of age. Kamaʻehuakanaloa (formerly Lōʻihi) on the island's flank is even younger, but has yet to breach the surface of the Pacific Ocean. At 1 million to 600,000 years of age, Mauna Loa is the second youngest of the five volcanoes on the island, making it the third youngest volcano in the Hawaiian – Emperor seamount chain, a chain of shield volcanoes and seamounts extending from Hawaii to the Kuril–Kamchatka Trench in Russia.

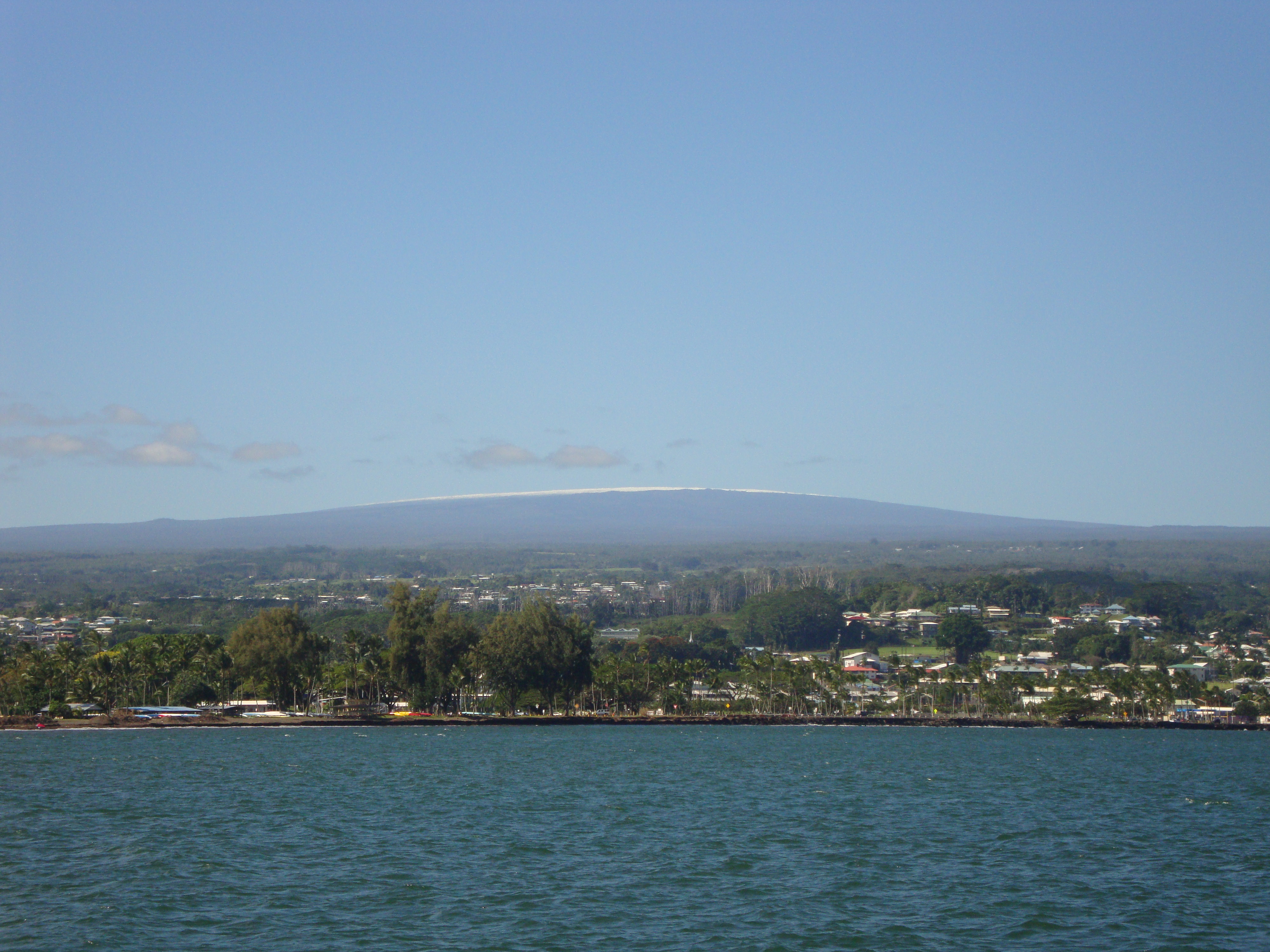
Mauna Loa from Hilo Bay, December 2017

Following the pattern of Hawaiian volcano formation, Mauna Loa would have started as a submarine volcano, gradually building itself up through underwater eruptions of alkali basalt before emerging from the sea through a series of surtseyan eruptions about 400,000 years ago. Since then, the volcano has remained active, with a history of effusive and explosive eruptions, including 34 eruptions since the first well-documented eruption in 1843.

=== Structure ===
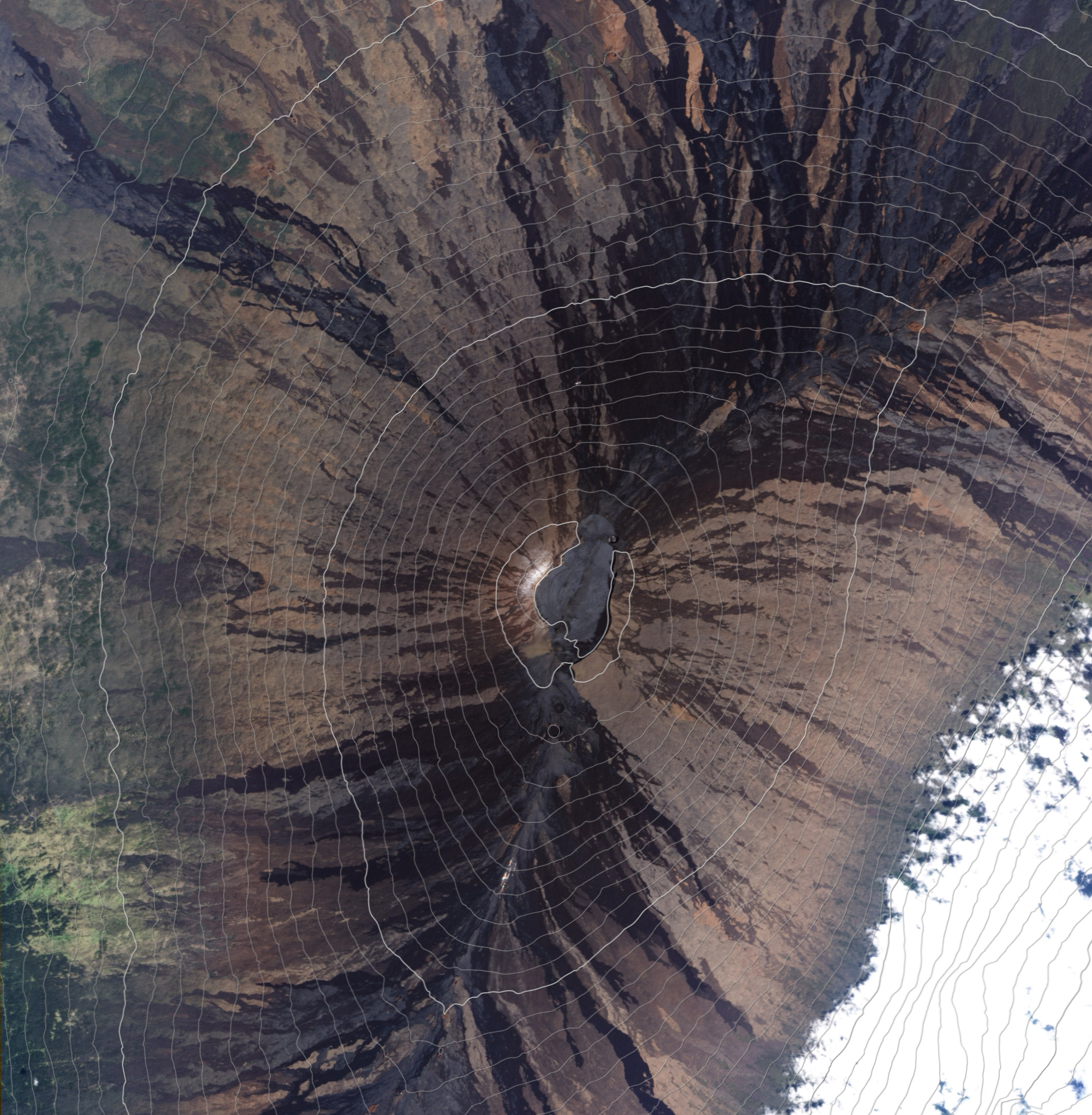
Mauna Loa's summit, overlaid with 100 m (328 ft) contour lines; its rift zones are visible from the air.

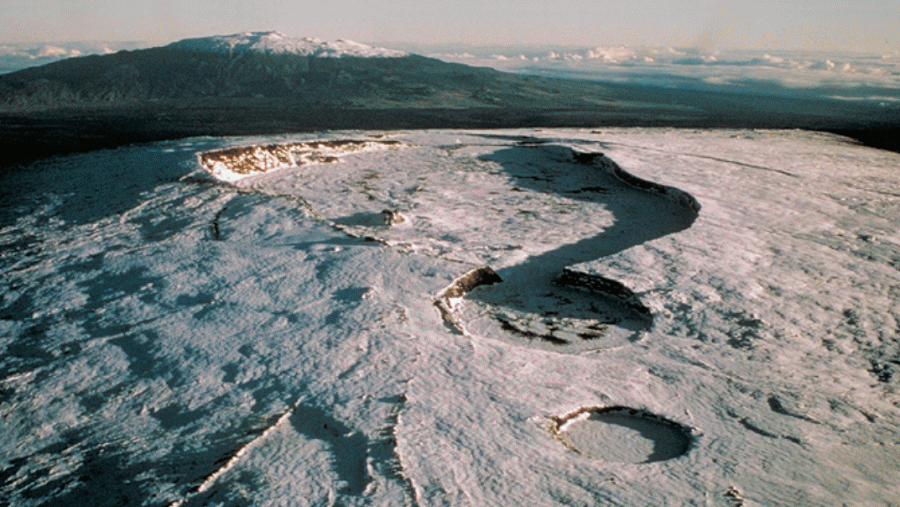
Mokuʻāweoweo, Mauna Loa's summit caldera, covered in snow.

Mauna Loa is the largest active volcano on Earth and the planet's third largest volcano behind Pūhāhonu, which is also in the Hawaiian chain, and the Tamu Massif. It covers a land area of 5,271 km^{2} (2,035 mi^{2}) and spans a maximum width of 120 km (75 mi). Consisting of approximately 65,000 to 80,000 km^{3} (15,600 to 19,200 mi^{3}) of solid rock, it makes up more than half of the surface area of the island of Hawaiʻi. Combining the volcano's extensive submarine flanks (5,000 m (16,400 ft) to the sea floor) and 4,170 m (13,680 ft) subaerial height, Mauna Loa rises 9,170 m (30,085 ft) from base to summit, greater than the 8,848 m or 29,029 ft elevation of Mount Everest from sea level to its summit. In addition, much of the mountain is invisible even underwater: its mass depresses the crust beneath it by another 8 km (5 mi), in the shape of an inverse mountain, meaning the total height of Mauna Loa from the start of its eruptive history is about 17,170 m (56,000 ft).

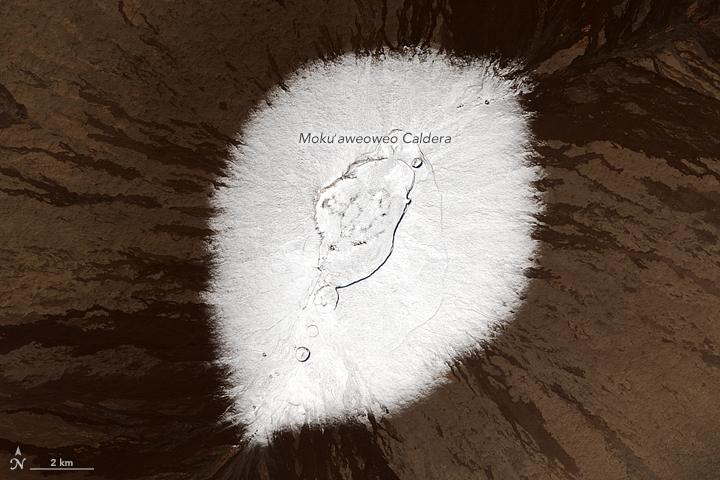
Snow-covered Moku'aweoweo caldera in 2016

Mauna Loa is a typical shield volcano in form, taking the shape of a long, broad dome extending down to the ocean floor whose slopes are about 12° at their steepest, a consequence of its extremely fluid lava. The shield-stage lavas that built the enormous main mass of the mountain are tholeiitic basalts, like those of Mauna Kea, created through the mixing of primary magma and subducted oceanic crust. Mauna Loa's summit hosts three overlapping pit craters arranged northeast–southwest, the first and last roughly 1 km (0.6 mi) in diameter and the second an oblong 4.2 km × 2.5 km (2.6 mi × 1.6 mi) feature; together these three craters make up the 6.2 by 2.5 km (3.9 by 1.6 mi) summit caldera Mokuʻāweoweo, so named for the Hawaiian ʻāweoweo fish (Priacanthus meeki), purportedly due to the resemblance of its eruptive fires to the coloration of the fish. Mokuʻāweoweo's caldera floor lies between 170 and 50 m (558 and 164 ft) beneath its rim and it is only the latest of several calderas that have formed and reformed over the volcano's life. It was created between 1,000 and 1,500 years ago by a large eruption from Mauna Loa's northeast rift zone, which emptied out a shallow magma chamber beneath the summit and collapsed it into its present form. Additionally, two smaller pit craters lie southwest of the caldera, named Lua Hou (New Pit) and Lua Hohonu (Deep Pit).

Mauna Loa's summit is also the focal point for its two prominent rift zones, marked on the surface by well-preserved, relatively recent lava flows (easily seen in satellite imagery) and linearly arranged fracture lines intersected by cinder and splatter cones. These rift zones are deeply set structures, driven by dike intrusions along a decollement fault that is believed to reach down all the way to the volcano's base, 12 to 14 km (7 to 9 mi) deep. The first is a 60 km (37 mi) rift trending southwest from the caldera to the sea and a further 40 km (25 mi) underwater, with a prominent 40° directional change along its length; this rift zone is historically active across most of its length. The second, northeastern rift zone extends towards Hilo and is historically active across only the first 20 km (12 mi) of its length, with a nearly straight and, in its latter sections, poorly defined trend. The northeastern rift zone takes the form of a succession of cinder cones, the most prominent of which the 60 m (197 ft) high Puu Ulaula, or Red Hill. There is also a less definite northward rift zone that extends towards the Humuula Saddle marking the intersection of Mauna Loa and Mauna Kea.

Simplified geophysical models of Mauna Loa's magma chamber have been constructed, using interferometric synthetic aperture radar measures of ground deformation due to the slow buildup of lava under the volcano's surface. These models predict a 1.1 km (1 mi) wide magma chamber located at a depth of about 4.7 km (3 mi), 0.5 km (0 mi) below sea level, near the southeastern margin of Mokuʻāweoweo. This shallow magma chamber is significantly higher-placed than Mauna Loa's rift zones, suggesting magma intrusions into the deeper parts and occasional dike injections into the shallower parts of the rift zone drive rift activity; a similar mechanism has been proposed for neighboring Kīlauea. Earlier models, based on Mauna Loa's 1975 and 1984 eruptions, made a similar prediction, placing the chamber at 3 km (1.9 mi) deep in roughly the same geographic position.

Mauna Loa has complex interactions with its neighbors, Hualālai to the northwest, Mauna Kea to the northeast, and particularly Kīlauea to the east. Lavas from Mauna Kea intersect with Mauna Loa's basal flows as a consequence of Kea's older age, and Mauna Kea's original rift zones were buried beneath post-shield volcanic rocks of Mauna Loa; additionally, Mauna Kea shares Mauna Loa's gravity well, depressing the ocean crust beneath it by 6 km (4 mi). There are also a series of normal faults on Mauna Loa's northern and western slopes, between its two major rift zones, that are believed to be the result of combined circumferential tension from the two rift zones and from added pressure due to the westward growth of neighboring Kīlauea.

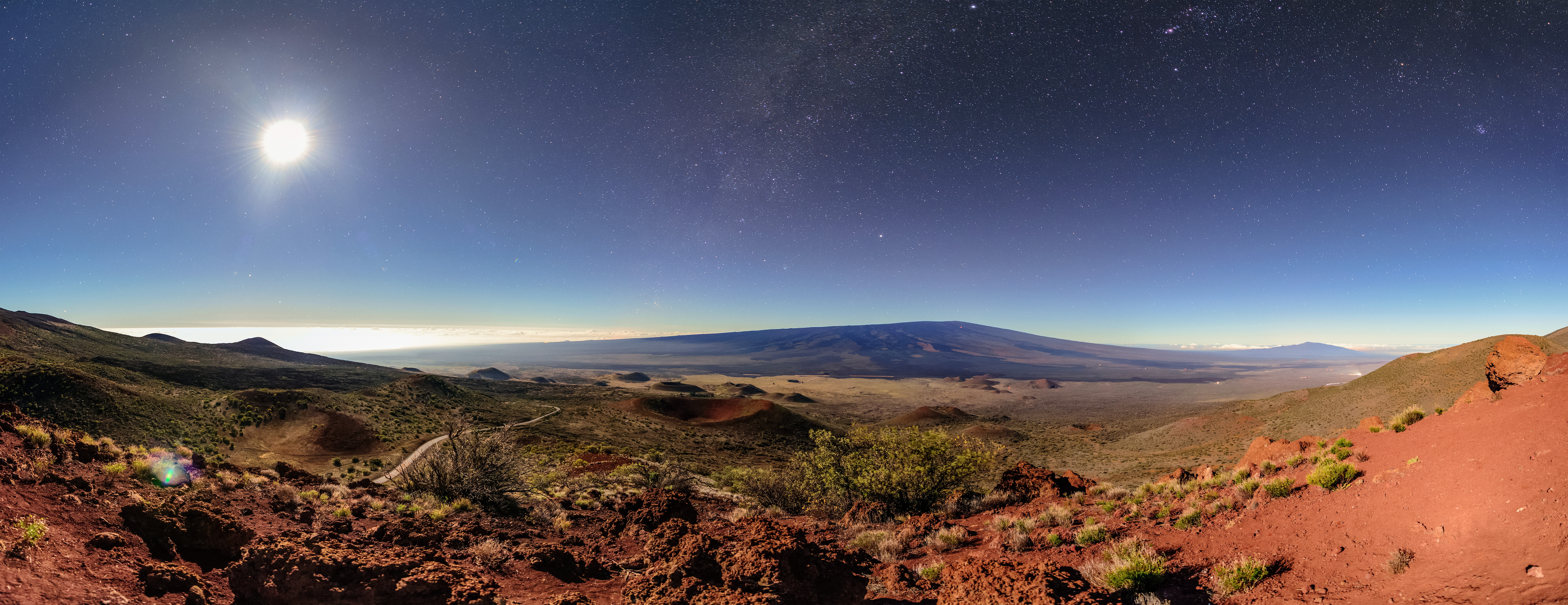
Captured from Maunakea, this Image features a skyscape of Mauna Loa.

Because Kīlauea lacks topographical prominence and appears as a bulge on the southeastern flank of Mauna Loa, it was historically interpreted by both native Hawaiians and early geologists to be an active satellite of Mauna Loa. However, analysis of the chemical composition of lavas from the two volcanoes show that they have separate magma chambers, and are thus distinct. Nonetheless, their proximity has led to a historical trend in which high activity at one volcano roughly coincides with low activity at the other. When Kīlauea lay dormant between 1934 and 1952, Mauna Loa became active, and when the latter remained quiet from 1952 to 1974, the reverse was true. This is not always the case; the 1984 eruption of Mauna Loa started during an eruption at Kīlauea, but had no discernible effect on the Kīlauea eruption, and the 2022 eruption of Mauna Loa occurred during an eruption of Kīlauea. Geologists have suggested that "pulses" of magma entering Mauna Loa's deeper magma system may have increased pressure inside Kīlauea and triggered the concurrent eruptions.

Mauna Loa is slumping eastward along its southwestern rift zone, leveraging its mass into Kīlauea and driving the latter eastward at a rate of about 10 cm (4 in) per year; the interaction between the two volcanoes in this manner has generated a number of large earthquakes in the past, and has resulted in a significant area of debris off Kīlauea's seaward flank known as the Hilina Slump. A system of older faults exists on the southeastern side of Mauna Loa that likely formed before Kilauea became large enough to impede Mauna Loa's slump, the lowest and northernmost of which, the Kaoiki fault, remains an active earthquake center today. The west side of Mauna Loa, meanwhile, is unimpeded in movement, and indeed is believed to have undergone a massive slump collapse between 100,000 and 200,000 years ago, the residue from which, consisting of a scattering of debris up to several kilometers wide and up to 50 km (31 mi) distant, is still visible today. The damage was so extensive that the headwall of the damage likely intersected its southwestern rift zone. There is very little movement there today, a consequence of the volcano's geometry.

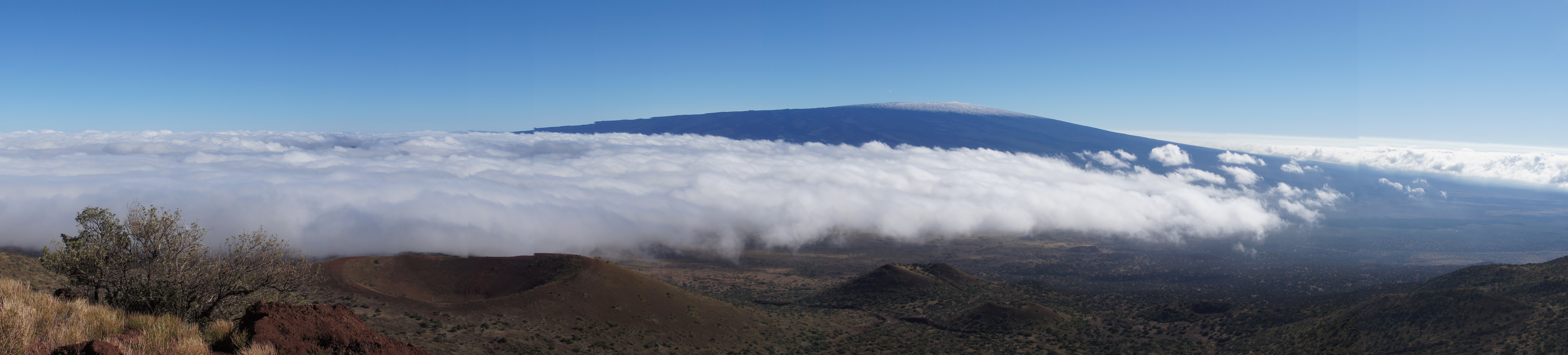
A view of Mauna Loa taken from a hill near The Onizuka Center for International Astronomy Visitor Information Station at the 9,300 ft (2,800 m) level of Mauna Kea.

Mauna Loa is tall enough to have experienced glaciation during the last ice age, 25,000 to 15,000 years ago. Unlike Mauna Kea, on which extensive evidence of glaciation remains even today, Mauna Loa was at the time and has remained active, having grown an additional 150 to 300 m (492 to 984 ft) in height since then and covering any glacial deposits beneath new flows; strata of that age don't occur until at least 2,000 m (6,562 ft) down from the volcano's summit, too low for glacial growth. Mauna Loa also lacks its neighbor's summit permafrost region, although sporadic ice persists in places. It is speculated that extensive phreatomagmatic activity occurred during this time, contributing extensively to ash deposits on the summit.

== Eruptive history ==
=== Prehistoric eruptions ===
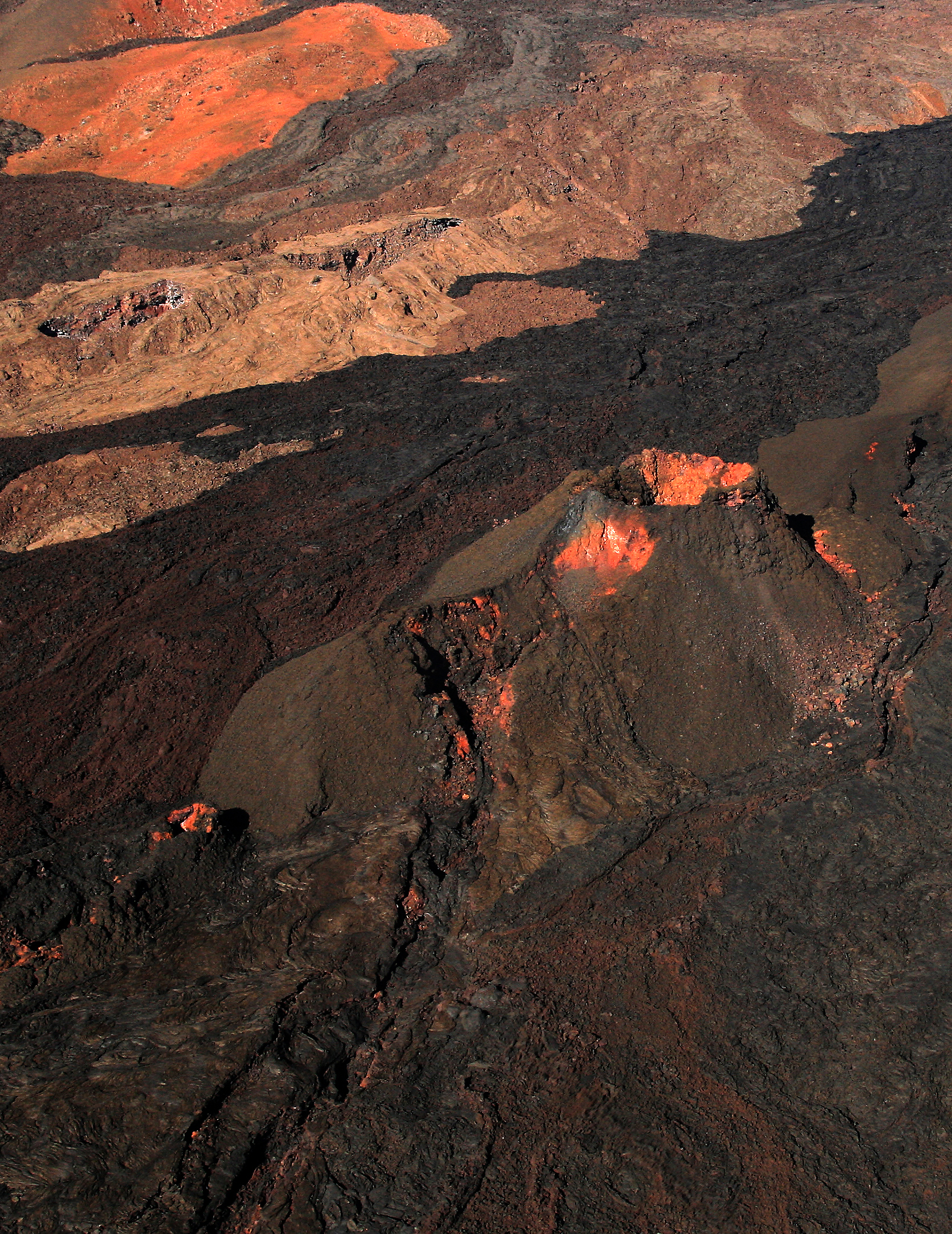
A cinder cone and surrounding flows on Mauna Loa

To have reached its enormous size within its relatively short (geologically speaking) 600,000 to 1,000,000 years of life, Mauna Loa would logically have had to have grown extremely rapidly through its developmental history, and extensive charcoal-based radiocarbon dating (perhaps the most extensive such prehistorical eruptive dating on Earth) has amassed a record of almost two hundred reliably dated extant flows confirming this hypothesis.

Lava samples, including those obtained by drilling projects, have been dated at least to 470,000 years ago. For technical reasons the oldest ages obtained by modern techniques at 657,000 years ago have large errors of the order of 200,000 years, as did some historic dating attempts on younger lavas making them older than was the case. Some of the oldest exposed flows on Mauna Loa are the Ninole Hills on its southern flank, subaerial basalt rock dating back approximately 100 to 200 thousand years. They form a terrace against which younger flows have since banked, heavily eroded and incised against its slope in terms of direction; this is believed to be the result of a period of erosion because of a change in the direction of lava flow caused by the volcano's prehistoric slump. These are followed by two units of lava flows separated by an intervening ash layer known as the Pāhala ash layer: the older Kahuka basalt, sparsely exposed on the lower southwest rift, and the younger and far more widespread Kaʻu basalt, which appear more widely on the volcano. The Pāhala ashes themselves were produced over a long period of time circa 13 to 30 thousand years ago, although heavy vitrification and interactions with post- and pre- creation flows has hindered exact dating. Their age roughly corresponds to the glaciation of Mauna Loa during the last ice age, raising the distinct possibility that it is the product of phreatomagmatic interaction between the long-gone glaciers and Mauna Loa's eruptive activities.

Studies have shown that a cycle occurs in which volcanic activity at the summit is dominant for several hundred years, after which activity shifts to the rift zones for several more centuries, and then back to the summit again. Two cycles have been clearly identified, each lasting 1,500–2,000 years. This cyclical behavior is unique to Mauna Loa among the Hawaiian volcanoes. Between about 7,000 and 6,000 years ago Mauna Loa was largely inactive. The cause of this cessation in activity is not known, and no known similar hiatus has been found at other Hawaiian volcanoes except for those currently in the post-shield stage. Between 11,000 and 8,000 years ago, activity was more intense than it is today. However, Mauna Loa's overall rate of growth has probably begun to slow over the last 100,000 years, and the volcano may in fact be nearing the end of its tholeiitic basalt shield-building phase.

=== Recent history ===
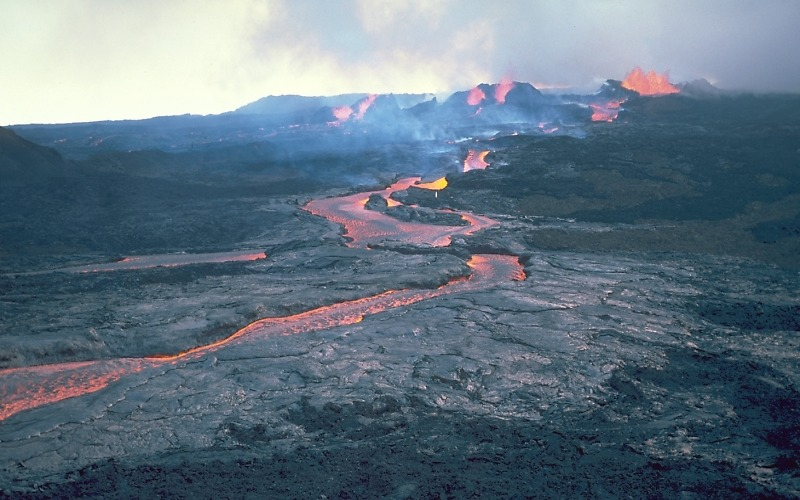
Lava fountains and a'a channel flow from Mauna Loa, 1984

Ancient Hawaiians have been present on Hawaiʻi island for about 1,500 years, but they preserved almost no records on volcanic activity on the island, beyond a few fragmentary accounts dating to the late 18th and early 19th centuries. Possible eruptions occurred around 1730 and 1750 and sometime during 1780 and 1803. A June 1832 eruption was witnessed by a missionary on Maui, but the 190 km (118 mi) between the two islands and lack of apparent geological evidence have cast this testimony in doubt. Thus the first entirely confirmed historically witnessed eruption was a January 1843 event; since that time Mauna Loa has erupted 32 times.

Historical eruptions at Mauna Loa are typically Hawaiian in character and rarely violent, starting with the emergence of lava fountains over a several kilometer long rift colloquially known as the "curtain of fire" (often, but not always, propagating from Mauna Loa's summit) and eventually concentrating at a single vent, its long-term eruptive center. Activity centered on its summit is usually followed by flank eruptions up to a few months later, and although Mauna Loa is historically less active than that of its neighbor Kilauea, it tends to produce greater volumes of lava over shorter periods of time. Most eruptions are centered at either the summit or either of its two major rift zones; within the last two hundred years, 38 percent of eruptions occurred at the summit, 31 percent at the northeast rift zone, 25 percent at the southwest rift zone, and the remaining 6 percent from northwest vents. 40 percent of the volcano's surface consists of lavas less than a thousand years old, and 98 percent of lavas less than 10,000 years old. In addition to the summit and rift zones, Mauna Loa's northwestern flank has also been the source of three historical eruptions.

The 1843 event was followed by eruptions in 1849, 1851, 1852, and 1855, with the 1855 flows being particularly extensive. 1859 marked the largest of the three historical flows that have been centered on Mauna Loa's northwestern flank, producing a long lava flow that reached the ocean on Hawaii island's west coast, north of Kīholo Bay. An eruption in 1868 occurred alongside the enormous 1868 Hawaii earthquake, a magnitude eight event that claimed 77 lives and remains the largest earthquake ever to hit the island. Following further activity in 1871, Mauna Loa experienced nearly continuous activity from August 1872 through 1877, a long-lasting and voluminous eruption lasting approximately 1,200 days and never moving beyond its summit. A short single-day eruption in 1877 was unusual in that it took place underwater, in Kealakekua Bay, and within a mile of the shoreline; curious onlookers approaching the area in boats reported unusually turbulent water and occasional floating blocks of hardened lava. Further eruptions occurred in 1879 and then twice in 1880, the latter of which extended into 1881 and came within the present boundaries of the island's largest city, Hilo; however, at the time, the settlement was a shore-side village located further down the volcano's slope, and so was unaffected.

Clickable imagemap of the United States Geological Survey hazard mapping for Hawaii island; the lowest numbers correspond with the highest hazard levels.

Mauna Loa continued its activity, and of the eruptions that occurred in 1887, 1892, 1896, 1899, 1903 (twice), 1907, 1914, 1916, 1919, and 1926, three (in 1887, 1919, and 1926) were partially subaerial. The 1926 eruption in particular is noteworthy for having inundated a village near Hoʻōpūloa, destroying 12 houses, a church, and a small harbor. After an event in 1933, Mauna Loa's 1935 eruption caused a public crisis when its flows started to head towards Hilo. A bombing operation was decided upon to try and divert the flows, planned out by then-lieutenant colonel George S. Patton. The bombing, conducted on December 27, was declared a success by Thomas A. Jaggar, director of the Hawaiian Volcano Observatory, and lava stopped flowing by January 2, 1936. However, the role the bombing played in ending the eruption has since been heavily disputed by volcanologists. A longer but summit-bound event in 1940 was comparatively less interesting.

Mauna Loa's 1942 eruption occurred only four months after the attack on Pearl Harbor and the United States' entry into World War II, and created a unique problem for the wartime United States. Occurring during an enforced nighttime blackout on the island, the eruption's luminosity forced the government to issue a gag order on the local press, hoping to prevent news of its occurrence spreading, for fear that the Japanese would use it to launch a bombing run on the island. However, as flows from the eruption rapidly spread down the volcano's flank and threatened the ʻOlaʻa flume, Mountain View's primary water source, the United States Army Air Force decided to drop its own bombs on the island in the hopes of redirecting the flows away from the flume; sixteen bombs weighing between 300 and 600 lb (136 and 272 kg) each were dropped on the island, but produced little effect. Eventually, the eruption ceased on its own.

Following a 1949 event, the next major eruption at Mauna Loa occurred in 1950. Originating from the volcano's southwestern rift zone, the eruption remains the largest rift event in the volcano's modern history, lasting 23 days, emitting 376 million cubic meters of lava, and reaching the 24 km (15 mi) distant ocean within 3 hours. The 1950 eruption was not the most voluminous eruption on the volcano (the long-lived 1872–1877 event produced more than twice as much material), but it was easily one of the fastest-acting, producing the same amount of lava as the 1859 eruption in a tenth of the time. Flows overtook the village of Hoʻokena-mauka in South Kona, crossed Hawaii Route 11, and reached the sea within four hours of eruption. Although there was no loss of life, the village was permanently destroyed. After the 1950 event, Mauna Loa entered an extended period of dormancy, interrupted only by a small single-day summit event in 1975. However, it rumbled to life again in 1984, manifesting first at Mauna Loa's summit, and then producing a narrow, channelized ʻaʻā flow that advanced downslope within 6 km (4 mi) of Hilo, close enough to illuminate the city at nighttime. However, the flow got no closer, as two natural levees further up its pathway consequently broke and diverted active flows.

From 1985 to 2022, the volcano had its longest period of quiet in recorded history. Magma had been accumulating beneath Mauna Loa since the 1984 eruption, and the U.S. Geological Survey in February 2021 reported that although an eruption "did not appear to be imminent," the volcano had shown elevated signs of unrest since 2019, including a slight increase in the rate of inflation at the volcano's summit.

The quiet period ended at 11:30 pm HST on November 27, 2022, when an eruption began at the volcano's summit in Moku'āweoweo (Mauna Loa's caldera). Lava flows emanating from the caldera became visible from Kailua-Kona in the hours immediately following the eruption. The eruption remained confined to the caldera until approximately 6:30 am HST on November 28, when the Hawaiian Volcano Observatory observed that the eruption had migrated from the summit to the Northeast Rift Zone. Three fissures were initially observed in the rift zone, with the first two becoming inactive by 1:30 PM on the 28th. Before becoming inactive, the two upper fissures fed lava flows that moved downslope, however those flows stalled approximately 11 miles (18 km) from Saddle Road. Lava fountains were also observed emanating from the fissures, with the tallest reaching up to 200 feet (61 m) into the air. As lava flows from the third fissure expanded, they cut off the road to the Mauna Loa Observatory at approximately 8 pm on the 28th. Activity in the rift zone continued on the 29th, with a fourth fissure that opened at approximately 7:30 pm on the 28th joining the third in releasing lava flows. The main front of the third fissure's lava flows also continued to move, and was located approximately 2.7 miles (4.3 km) from Saddle Road at 7 am on December 2.

As the eruption approached its second week, indications of a reduction in activity began to appear. On December 8, the lava flows feeding the main front began to drain, and the main flow front stalled approximately 1.7 miles (2.7 km) from Saddle Road. The flows continued to drain on the 9th, and the third fissure's lava fountains also began to grow shorter. On the 10th, the lava fountains were replaced by a lava pond, and the stalled flow front was declared to no longer be a threat. Based on these factors and data on past eruptions, the HVO determined that the eruption may end soon and reduced the volcano alert level from Warning to Watch at 2:35 pm on the 10th. However, there was a small possibility that the eruption would continue at a very low rate. The eruption officially ended at 7:17 am on the 13th, and the HVO lowered the volcano alert level to Advisory.

=== Hazards ===
Mauna Loa has been designated a Decade Volcano, one of the sixteen volcanoes identified by the International Association of Volcanology and Chemistry of the Earth's Interior (IAVCEI) as being worthy of particular study in light of their history of large, destructive eruptions and proximity to populated areas. The United States Geological Survey maintains a hazard zone mapping of the island done on a one to nine scale, with the most dangerous areas corresponding the smallest numbers. Based on this classification Mauna Loa's continuously active summit caldera and rift zones have been given a level one designation. Much of the area immediately surrounding the rift zones is considered level two, and about 20 percent of the area has been covered in lava in historical times. Much of the remainder of the volcano is hazard level three, about 15 to 20 percent of which has been covered by flows within the last 750 years. However, two sections of the volcano, the first in the Naalehu area and the second on the southeastern flank of Mauna Loa's rift zone, are protected from eruptive activity by local topography, and have thus been designated hazard level 6, comparable with a similarly isolated segment on Kīlauea.

Although volcanic eruptions in Hawaiʻi rarely produce casualties (the only direct historical fatality due to volcanic activity on the island occurred at Kīlauea in 1924, when an unusually explosive eruption hurled rocks at an onlooker), property damage due to inundation by lava is a common and costly hazard. Hawaiian-type eruptions usually produce extremely slow-moving flows that advance at walking pace, presenting little danger to human life, but this is not strictly the case; Mauna Loa's 1950 eruption emitted as much lava in three weeks as Kīlauea's recent eruption produced in three years and reached sea level within four hours of its start, overrunning the village of Hoʻokena Mauka and a major highway on the way there. An earlier eruption in 1926 overran the village of Hoʻōpūloa Makai, and Hilo, partly built on lavas from the 1880–81 eruption, is at risk from future eruptions. The 1984 eruption nearly reached the city, but stopped short after the flow was redirected by upstream topography.

A potentially greater hazard at Mauna Loa is a sudden, massive collapse of the volcano's flanks, like the one that struck the volcano's west flank between 100,000 and 200,000 years ago and formed the present-day Kealakekua Bay. Deep fault lines are a common feature on Hawaiian volcanoes, allowing large portions of their flanks to gradually slide downwards and forming structures like the Hilina Slump and the ancient Ninole Hills; large earthquakes could trigger rapid flank collapses along these lines, creating massive landslides and possibly triggering equally large tsunamis. Undersea surveys have revealed numerous landslides along the Hawaiian chain and evidence of two such giant tsunami events: 200,000 years ago, Molokaʻi experienced a 75 m (246 ft) tsunami, and 100,000 years ago a megatsunami 325 m (1,066 ft) high struck Lānaʻi. A more recent example of the risks associated with slumps occurred in 1975, when the Hilina Slump suddenly lurched forward several meters, triggering a 7.2 M_{w} earthquake and a 14 m (46 ft) tsunami that killed two campers at Halape.

=== Monitoring ===
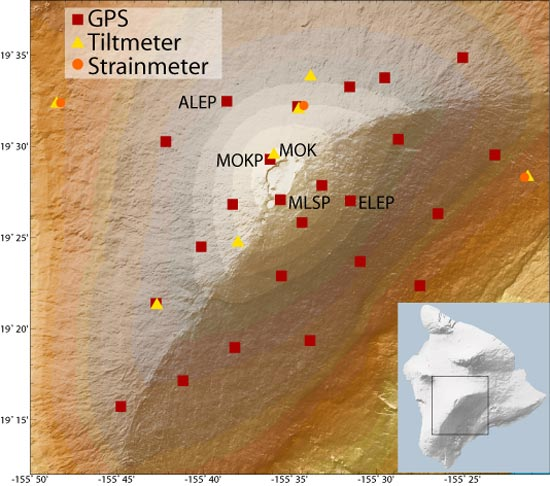
GPS stations, tiltmeters, and strainmeters on Mauna Loa's summit. Not shown: a webcam and a gas detector positioned on the caldera rim.

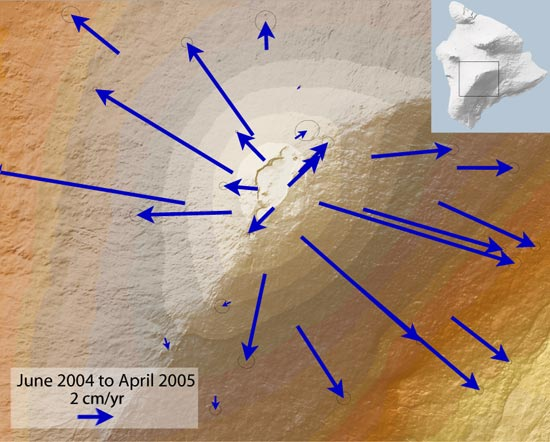
Summit inflation as measured via GPS between June 2004 and April 2005; arrows denote between 1 and 10 cm (0.4 and 3.9 in) of growth.

Established on Kīlauea in 1912, the Hawaiian Volcano Observatory (HVO), presently a branch of the United States Geological Survey, is the primary organization associated with the monitoring, observance, and study of Hawaiian volcanoes. Thomas A. Jaggar, the Observatory's founder, attempted a summit expedition to Mauna Loa to observe its 1914 eruption, but was rebuffed by the arduous trek required (see Ascents). After soliciting help from Lorrin A. Thurston, in 1915 he was able to persuade the US Army to construct a "simple route to the summit" for public and scientific use, a project completed in December of that year; the Observatory has maintained a presence on the volcano ever since.

Eruptions on Mauna Loa are almost always preceded and accompanied by prolonged episodes of seismic activity, the monitoring of which was the primary and often only warning mechanism in the past and which remains viable today. Seismic stations have been maintained on Hawaiʻi since the Observatory's inception, but these were concentrated primarily on Kīlauea, with coverage on Mauna Loa improving only slowly through the 20th century. Following the invention of modern monitoring equipment, the backbone of the present-day monitoring system was installed on the volcano in the 1970s. Mauna Loa's July 1975 eruption was forewarned by more than a year of seismic unrest, with the HVO issuing warnings to the general public from late 1974; the 1984 eruption was similarly preceded by as much as three years of unusually high seismic activity, with volcanologists predicting an eruption within two years in 1983.

The modern monitoring system on Mauna Loa consists not only of its local seismic network but also of a large number of GPS stations, tiltmeters, and strainmeters that have been anchored on the volcano to monitor ground deformation due to swelling of Mauna Loa's subterranean magma chamber, which presents a more complete picture of the events proceeding eruptive activity. The GPS network is the most durable and wide-ranging of the three systems, while the tiltmeters provide the most sensitive predictive data, but are prone to erroneous results unrelated to actual ground deformation; nonetheless a survey line across the caldera measured a 76 mm (3 in) increase in its width over the year preceding the 1975 eruption, and a similar increase in 1984 eruption. Strainmeters, by contrast, are relatively rare. The Observatory also maintains two gas detectors at Mokuʻāweoweo, Mauna Loa's summit caldera, as well as a publicly accessible live webcam and occasional screenings by interferometric synthetic aperture radar imaging.

== Human history ==
=== Pre-contact ===
The first Ancient Hawaiians to arrive on Hawaii island lived along the shores where food and water were plentiful. Flightless birds that had previously known no predators became a staple food source. Early settlements had a major impact on the local ecosystem, and caused many extinctions, particularly amongst bird species, as well as introducing foreign plants and animals and increasing erosion rates. The prevailing lowland forest ecosystem was transformed from forest to grassland; some of this change was caused by the use of fire, but the main reason appears to have been the introduction of the Polynesian rat (Rattus exulans).

Ancient Hawaiian religious practice holds that the five volcanic peaks of the island are sacred, and regards Mauna Loa, the largest of them all, with great admiration; but what mythology survives today consists mainly of oral accounts from the 18th century first compiled in the 19th. Most of these stories agree that the Hawaiian volcano goddess, Pele, resides in Halemaʻumaʻu on Kilauea; however a few place her home at Mauna Loa's summit caldera Mokuʻāweoweo, and the mythos in general associates her with all volcanic activity on the island. Regardless, Kīlauea's lack of a geographic outline and strong volcanic link to Mauna Loa led to it being considered an offshoot of Mauna Loa by the Ancient Hawaiians, meaning much of the mythos now associated with Kīlauea was originally directed at Mauna Loa proper as well.

Ancient Hawaiians constructed an extensive trail system on Hawaiʻi island, today known as the Ala Kahakai National Historic Trail. The network consisted of short trailheads servicing local areas along the main roads and more extensive networks within and around agricultural centers. The positioning of the trails was practical, connecting living areas to farms and ports, and regions to resources, with a few upland sections reserved for gathering and most lines marked well enough to remain identifiable long after regular use had ended. One of these trails, the Ainapo Trail, ascended from the village of Kapāpala over 3,400 m (11,155 ft) in about 56 km (35 mi) and ended at Mokuʻāweoweo at Mauna Loa's summit. Although the journey was arduous and required several days and many porters, ancient Hawaiians likely made the journey during eruptions to leave offerings and prayers to honor Pele, much as they did at Halemaʻumaʻu, neighboring Kilauea's more active and more easily accessible caldera. Several camps established along the way supplied water and food for travelers.

=== European summiting attempts ===
James Cook's third voyage was the first to make landfall on Hawaiʻi island, in 1778, and following adventures along the North American west coast, Cook returned to the island in 1779. On his second visit John Ledyard, a corporal of the Royal Marines aboard HMS Resolution, proposed and received approval for an expedition to the summit Mauna Loa to learn "about that part of the island, particularly the peak, the tip of which is generally covered with snow, and had excited great curiosity." Using a compass, Ledyard and small group of ships' mates and native attendants attempted to make a direct course for the summit. However, on the second day of traveling the route became steeper, rougher, and blocked by "impenetrable thickets," and the group was forced to abandon their attempt and return to Kealakekua Bay, reckoning they had "penetrated 24 miles and we suppose [were] within 11 miles of the peak"; in reality, Mokuʻāweoweo lies only 32 km (20 mi) east of the bay, a severe overestimation on Ledyard's part. Another of Cook's men, Lieutenant James King, estimated the peak to be at least 5,600 m (18,373 ft) high based on its snow line.

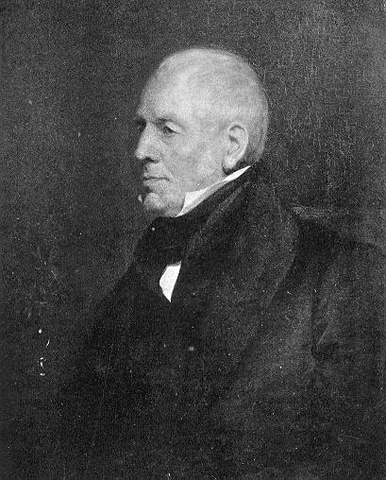
The Scottish botanist and naturalist Archibald Menzies was the first European to reach the summit of Mauna Loa, on his third attempt.

The next attempt to summit Mauna Loa was an expedition led by Archibald Menzies, a botanist and naturalist on the 1793 Vancouver Expedition. In February of that year Menzies, two ships' mates, and a small group of native Hawaiian attendants attempted a direct course for the summit from Kealakekua Bay, making it 26 km (16 mi) inland by their reckoning (an overestimation) before they were turned away by the thickness of the forest. On a second visit by the expedition to the island in January of the next year Menzies was placed in charge of exploring the island interior, and after traversing the flanks of Hualālai he and his party arrived at the high plateau separating the two volcanoes. Menzies decided to make a second attempt (above the objections of the accompanying island chief), but again his progress was arrested by unassailable thickets.

Menzies made a third attempt to summit Mauna Loa in February 1794. This time the botanist consulted King Kamehameha I for advice and learned that he could take canoes to the south and follow the ʻAinapō Trail, not knowing of its existence beforehand. Significantly better prepared, Menzies, Lieutenant Joseph Baker and Midshipman George McKenzie of Discovery, and a servant (most likely Jonathan Ewins, listed on the ship's muster as "Botanist's L't") reached the summit, which Menzies estimated to be 4,156 m (13,635 ft) high with the aid of a barometer (consistent with a modern value of 4,169 m, 13,678 ft). He was surprised to find heavy snow and morning temperatures of −3 °C (27 °F), and was unable to compare the heights of Mauna Loa and Kea but correctly supposed the latter to be taller based on its larger snow cap. The feat of summitting Mauna Loa was not to be repeated for forty years.

The Hawaiian Islands were the site of fervent missionary work, with the first group of missionaries arrived at Honolulu in 1820 and the second in 1823. Some of these missionaries left for Hawaiʻi island, and spent ten weeks traveling around it, preaching at local villages and climbing Kilauea, from which one of its members, William Ellis, observed Mauna Loa with the aid of a telescope and ascertained it and Kea to be "perhaps 15,000 to 16,000 feet above the level of the sea"; they did not, however, attempt to climb the volcano itself. It is sometimes reported that the missionary Joseph Goodrich reached the summit around this time, but he never claimed this himself, though he did summit Mauna Kea and describe Mokuʻāweoweo with the aid of another telescope.

The next successful ascent was made on January 29, 1834, by the Scottish botanist David Douglas, who also reached the summit caldera using the ʻAinapō Trail. By the time Douglas reached the summit the environment had put him under extreme duress, but he nonetheless stayed overnight to make measurements of the summit caldera's proportions and record barometric data on its height, both now known to be wildly inaccurate. Douglas collected biological samples on the way both up and down, and after a difficult and distressing descent began collating his samples; he planned to return to England, but instead several months later his body was discovered mysteriously crushed in a pit beside a dead wild boar.

Isidor Löwenstern successfully climbed Mauna Loa in February 1839, only the third successful climb in 60 years.

=== Wilkes expedition ===
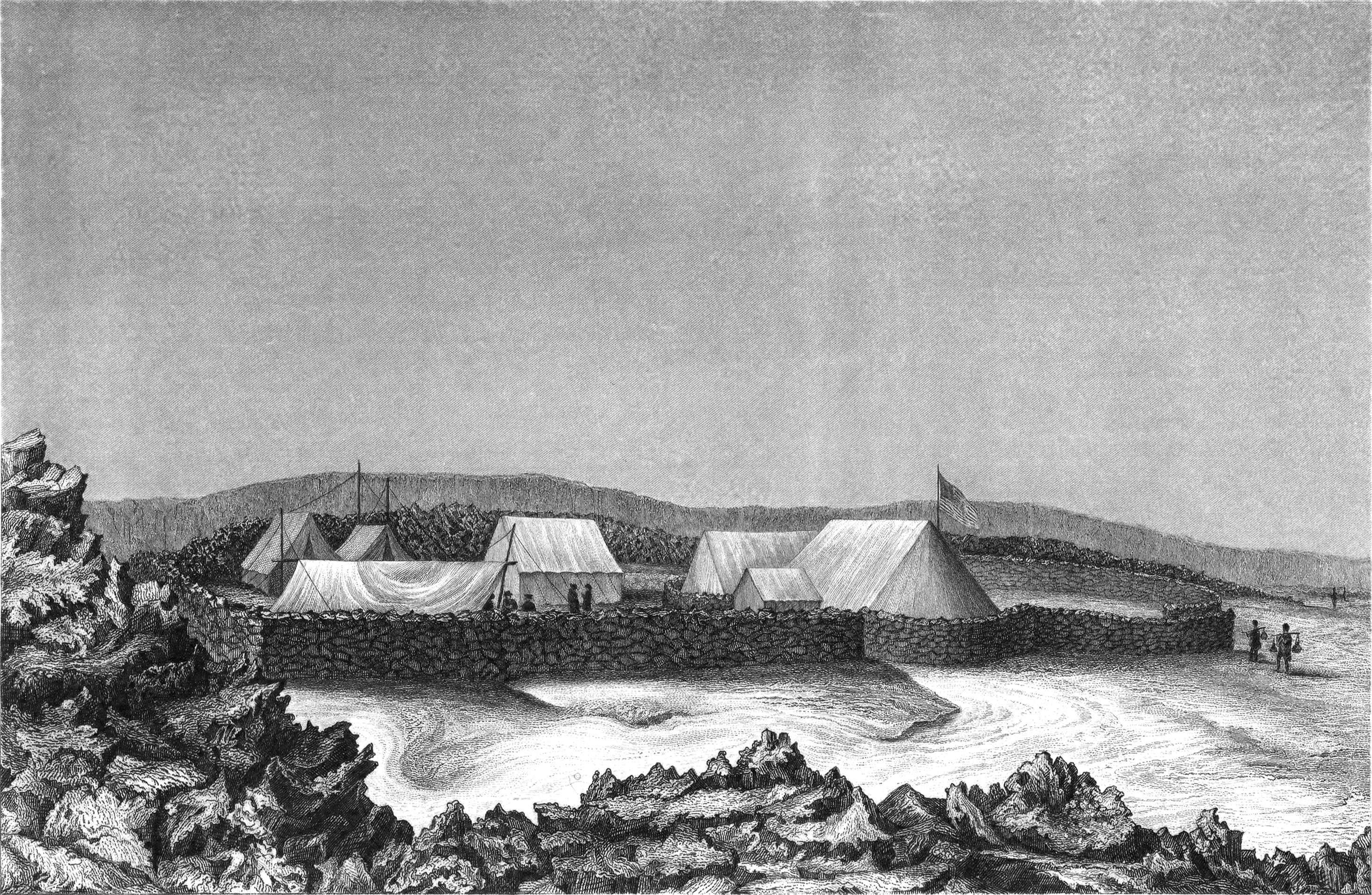
Sketch of Wilkes' campsite by ship's artist Alfred Thomas Agate

The United States Exploring Expedition led by Lieutenant Charles Wilkes was tasked with a vast survey of the Pacific Ocean starting in 1838. In September 1840 they arrived in Honolulu, where repairs to the ships took longer than expected. Wilkes decided to spend the winter in Hawaii and take the opportunity to explore its volcanoes while waiting for better weather to continue the expedition. King Kamehameha III assigned American medical missionary Dr. Gerrit P. Judd to the expedition as a translator.

Wilkes sailed to Hilo on the island of Hawaiʻi and decided to climb Mauna Loa first, since it looked easier than Mauna Kea. On December 14 he hired about 200 porters, but after he left he realized only about half the equipment had been taken, so he had to hire more Hawaiians at higher pay. When they reached Kīlauea after two days, their guide Puhano headed off to the established ʻAinapō Trail. Wilkes did not want to head back downhill so he blazed his own way through dense forest directed by a compass. The Hawaiians were offended by the waste of sacred trees which did not help morale. At about 6,000 feet (1,800 m) elevation they established a camp called "Sunday Station" at the edge of the forest.

Two guides joined them at Sunday Station: Keaweehu, "the bird-catcher" and another whose Hawaiian name is not recorded, called "ragsdale". Although Wilkes thought he was almost to the summit, the guides knew they were less than halfway up. Since there was no water at Sunday Station, porters had to be sent back ten miles (16 km) to a lava tube on ʻAinapō Trail which had a known supply. After an entire day replenishing stocks, they continued up to a second camp they called "Recruiting Station" at about 9,000 feet (2,700 m) elevation. After another full day's hike they established "Flag Station" on December 22, and by this time were on the ʻAinapō Trail. Most of the porters were sent back down to get another load.

At the Flag Station Wilkes and his eight remaining men built a circular wall of lava rocks and covered the shelter with a canvas tent. A snowstorm was in progress and several suffered from altitude sickness. That night (December 23), the snow on the canvas roof caused it to collapse. At daylight some of the group went down the trail to retrieve firewood and the gear abandoned on the trail the day before. After another day's climb, nine men reached the rim of Mokuʻāweoweo. They could not find a way down its steep sides so chose a smooth place on the rim for the camp site, at coordinates 19°27′59″N 155°34′54″W. Their tent was pitched within 60 feet (18 m) of the crater's edge, secured by lava blocks.

The next morning they were unable to start a fire using friction due to the thin air at that altitude, and sent for matches. By this time, the naval officers and Hawaiians could not agree on terms to continue hiring porters, so sailors and marines were ordered from the ships. Dr. Judd traveled between the summit and the Recruiting Station to tend the many who suffered from altitude sickness or had worn out their shoes on the rough rock. Christmas Day was spent building rock walls around the camp to give some protection from the high winds and blowing snow. It took another week to bring all the equipment to the summit, including a pendulum designed for measuring slight variations in gravity.

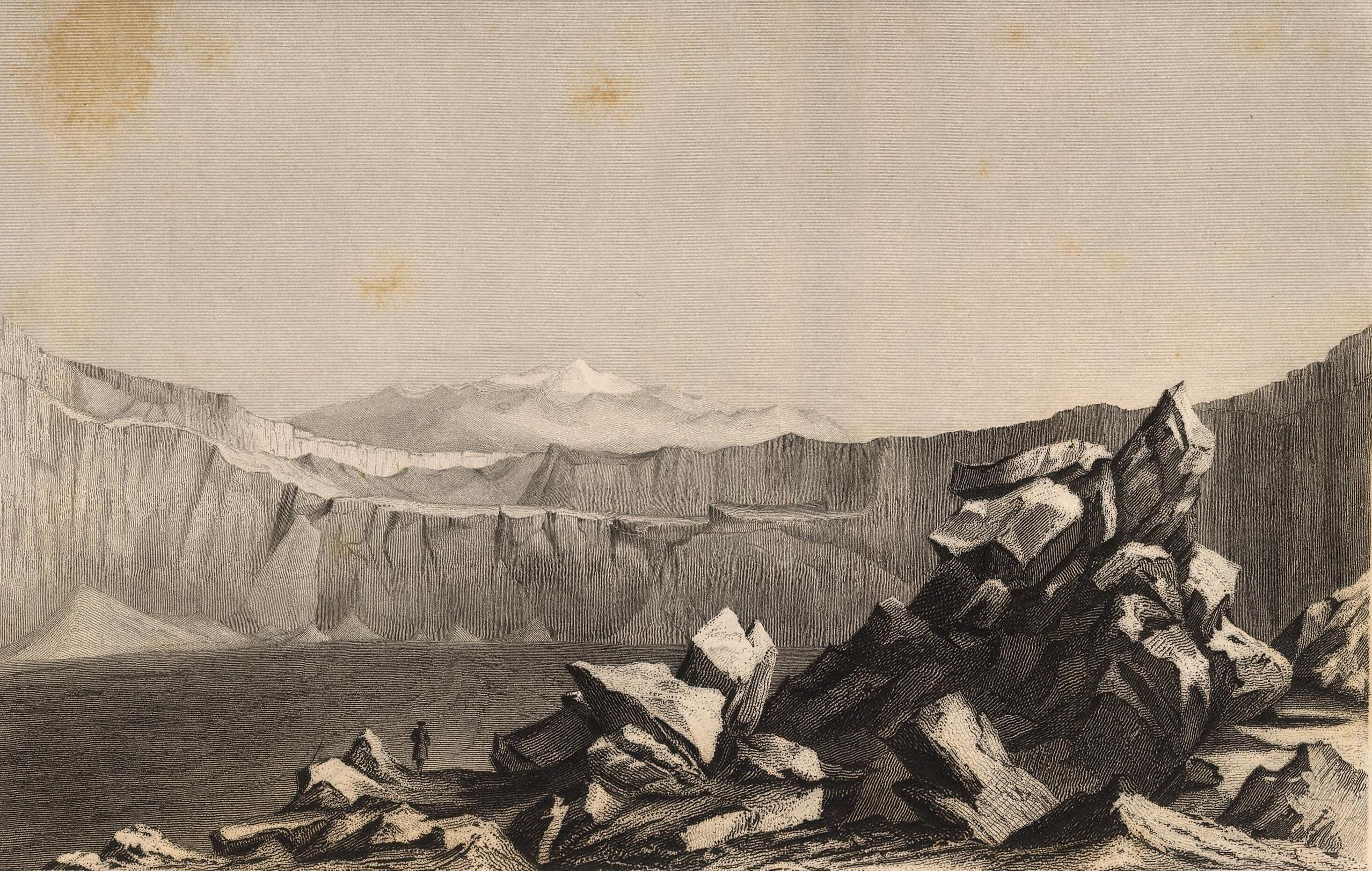
Sketch of Mokuʻāweoweo from Wilkes' journal

On December 31, 1840, the pre-fabricated pendulum house was assembled. Axes and chisels cut away the rock surface for the pendulum's base. It took another three days to adjust the clock to the point where the experiments could begin. However, the high winds made so much noise that the ticks could often not be heard, and varied the temperature to make measurements inaccurate. Grass had to be painstakingly brought from the lowest elevations for insulation to get accurate measurements.

On Monday, January 11, Wilkes hiked around the summit crater. Using an optical method, he estimated Mauna Kea was 193 feet (59 m) higher, while modern measurements indicate a difference of about 125 feet (38 m). On January 13, 1841, he had "Pendulum Peak, January 1841 U.S. Ex, Ex." cut into a rock at the site. The tents were dismantled and Hawaiians carried the gear down over the next three days, while Wilkes enjoyed a lomilomi massage. He continued his measurements at lower elevations and left the island on March 5. For all the effort he did not obtain any significant results, attributing gravity discrepancies to "the tides".

The Wilkes expedition's camp site's ruins are the only known physical evidence in the Pacific of the U.S. Exploring Expedition. The camp site was listed on the National Register of Historic Places on July 24, 1974, as site 74000295, and is state historic site 10-52-5507.

=== Today ===
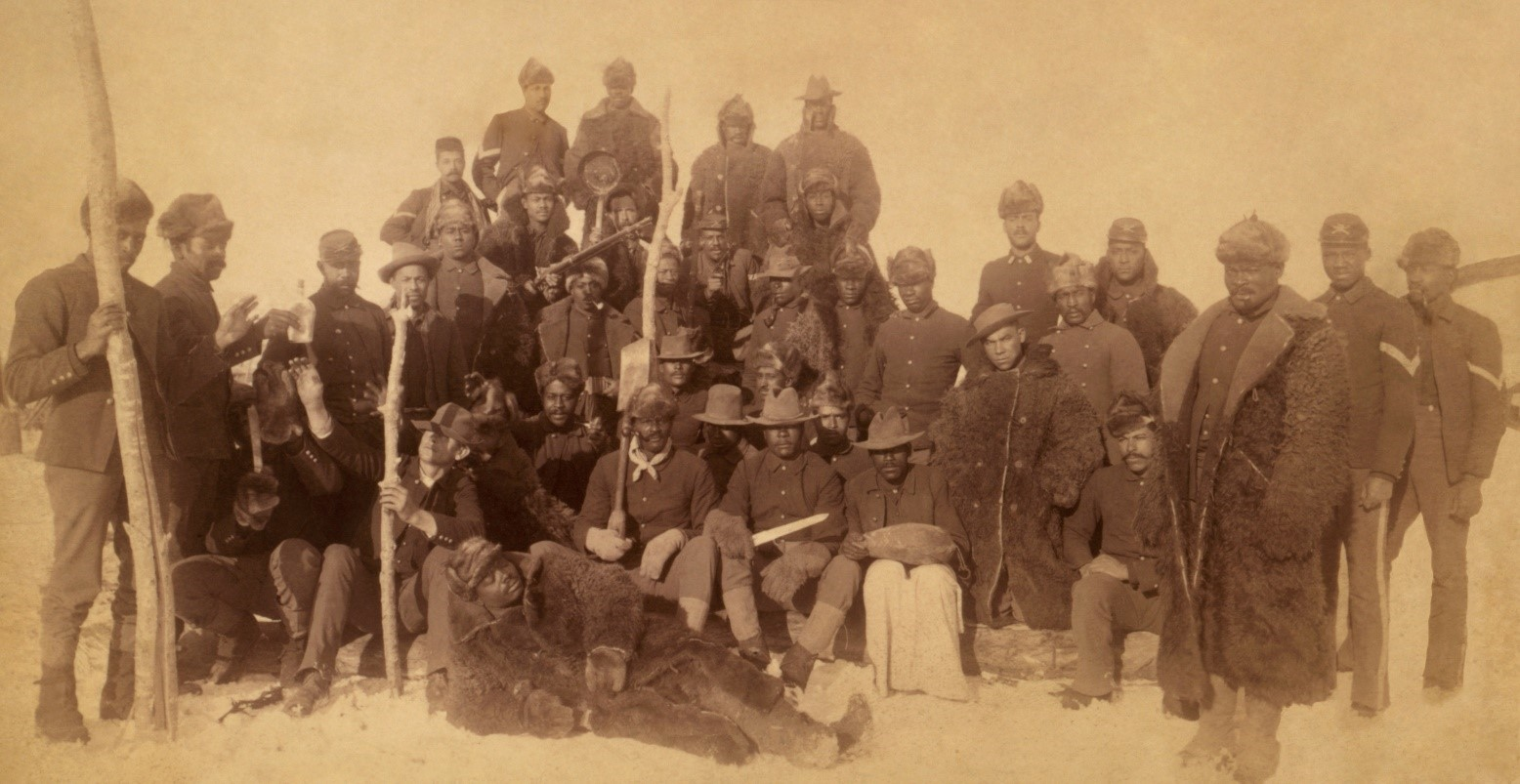
Buffalo Soldiers of the Twenty-fifth Infantry Regiment

In 1916 Mokuʻāweoweo was included in Hawaii Volcanoes National Park, and a new trail was built directly from park headquarters at Kīlauea, an even more direct route than the one taken by Wilkes. This new trail was spearheaded by Thomas A. Jaggar Jr. and would be known as the Mauna Loa Trail. He and the other members of the Mauna Loa Trail Committee recruited the help of the Twenty-fifth Infantry Regiment to build the trail. These soldiers, known as Buffalo Soldiers, built a nearly twenty seven mile trail up the summit of Mauna Loa. This trail, arriving at the summit from the east via Red Hill, became the preferred route due to its easier access and gentler slope. The historic ʻAinapō Trail fell into disuse, and was reopened in the 1990s. A third modern route to the summit is from the Saddle Road up to the Mauna Loa Observatory which is at 11,135 feet (3,394 m) elevation a few miles north of Mokuʻāweoweo and the North Pit trail.

== Climate ==
Climate chart for Mauna Loa

Trade winds blow from east to west across the Hawaiian islands, and the presence of Mauna Loa strongly affects the local climate. At low elevations, the eastern (windward) side of the volcano receives heavy rain; Hilo is the wettest city in Hawaii and the fourth-wettest city in the United States, behind the southeast Alaskan cities of Whittier, Ketchikan and Yakutat. The rainfall supports extensive forestation. The western (leeward) side has a much drier climate. At higher elevations, the amount of precipitation decreases, and skies are very often clear. Very low temperatures mean that precipitation often occurs in the form of snow, and the summit of Mauna Loa is described as a periglacial region, where freezing and thawing play a significant role in shaping the landscape.

Mauna Loa has a tropical climate with warm temperatures at lower elevations and cool to cold temperatures higher up year-round. Below is the table for the slope observatory, which is at 11,150 feet (3,400 m) in the alpine zone. The highest recorded temperature was 78 °F (26 °C) and the lowest was 18 °F (−8 °C) on September 26, 1990, and February 20, 1962, respectively.

Climate data for Mauna Loa 5 NNE (1991–2020 normals, extremes 2005–present)
| Month | Jan | Feb | Mar | Apr | May | Jun | Jul | Aug | Sep | Oct | Nov | Dec | Year |
|---|---|---|---|---|---|---|---|---|---|---|---|---|---|
| Record high °F (°C) | 66 (19) | 66 (19) | 66 (19) | 67 (19) | 67 (19) | 68 (20) | 69 (21) | 68 (20) | 67 (19) | 66 (19) | 64 (18) | 63 (17) | 69 (21) |
| Mean maximum °F (°C) | 60.1 (15.6) | 58.1 (14.5) | 58.5 (14.7) | 61.0 (16.1) | 63.7 (17.6) | 64.7 (18.2) | 65.3 (18.5) | 64.8 (18.2) | 62.8 (17.1) | 62.9 (17.2) | 59.4 (15.2) | 58.6 (14.8) | 66.6 (19.2) |
| Mean daily maximum °F (°C) | 51.1 (10.6) | 50.1 (10.1) | 50.5 (10.3) | 53.1 (11.7) | 55.5 (13.1) | 57.6 (14.2) | 57.5 (14.2) | 57.3 (14.1) | 56.5 (13.6) | 55.8 (13.2) | 52.4 (11.3) | 51.1 (10.6) | 54.0 (12.2) |
| Daily mean °F (°C) | 43.2 (6.2) | 42.2 (5.7) | 42.7 (5.9) | 44.8 (7.1) | 47.4 (8.6) | 49.3 (9.6) | 49.1 (9.5) | 49.0 (9.4) | 48.6 (9.2) | 47.7 (8.7) | 44.8 (7.1) | 43.4 (6.3) | 46.0 (7.8) |
| Mean daily minimum °F (°C) | 35.4 (1.9) | 34.3 (1.3) | 34.8 (1.6) | 36.5 (2.5) | 39.3 (4.1) | 41.1 (5.1) | 40.7 (4.8) | 40.7 (4.8) | 40.6 (4.8) | 39.6 (4.2) | 37.2 (2.9) | 35.8 (2.1) | 38.0 (3.3) |
| Mean minimum °F (°C) | 28.1 (−2.2) | 27.7 (−2.4) | 29.7 (−1.3) | 31.3 (−0.4) | 32.7 (0.4) | 35.4 (1.9) | 35.2 (1.8) | 35.6 (2.0) | 35.9 (2.2) | 34.8 (1.6) | 31.4 (−0.3) | 30.5 (−0.8) | 25.7 (−3.5) |
| Record low °F (°C) | 22 (−6) | 21 (−6) | 27 (−3) | 28 (−2) | 31 (−1) | 31 (−1) | 30 (−1) | 31 (−1) | 33 (1) | 32 (0) | 29 (−2) | 26 (−3) | 21 (−6) |
| Average precipitation inches (mm) | 1.10 (28) | 1.04 (26) | 1.94 (49) | 0.87 (22) | 0.60 (15) | 0.43 (11) | 1.27 (32) | 2.38 (60) | 0.67 (17) | 1.47 (37) | 1.21 (31) | 1.32 (34) | 14.30 (363) |
| Average precipitation days (≥ 0.01 inch) | 3.9 | 5.7 | 6.8 | 4.1 | 4.1 | 2.1 | 3.7 | 6.0 | 4.8 | 4.9 | 4.6 | 5.6 | 56.3 |
Source: NOAA

Climate data for Mauna Loa slope observatory 3,400 meters (11,150 feet) (1981–2010 normals, extremes 1955–present)
| Month | Jan | Feb | Mar | Apr | May | Jun | Jul | Aug | Sep | Oct | Nov | Dec | Year |
|---|---|---|---|---|---|---|---|---|---|---|---|---|---|
| Record high °F (°C) | 67 (19) | 69 (21) | 66 (19) | 67 (19) | 68 (20) | 71 (22) | 70 (21) | 69 (21) | 78 (26) | 68 (20) | 65 (18) | 67 (19) | 78 (26) |
| Mean maximum °F (°C) | 59.7 (15.4) | 59.2 (15.1) | 59.3 (15.2) | 61.0 (16.1) | 62.5 (16.9) | 64.9 (18.3) | 65.0 (18.3) | 64.9 (18.3) | 64.1 (17.8) | 62.2 (16.8) | 60.2 (15.7) | 59.6 (15.3) | 67.2 (19.6) |
| Mean daily maximum °F (°C) | 51.9 (11.1) | 51.2 (10.7) | 51.9 (11.1) | 53.2 (11.8) | 55.8 (13.2) | 58.5 (14.7) | 57.5 (14.2) | 57.9 (14.4) | 56.7 (13.7) | 55.7 (13.2) | 53.2 (11.8) | 52.0 (11.1) | 54.6 (12.6) |
| Daily mean °F (°C) | 43.6 (6.4) | 42.4 (5.8) | 43.1 (6.2) | 44.3 (6.8) | 47.1 (8.4) | 49.3 (9.6) | 48.6 (9.2) | 49.1 (9.5) | 48.1 (8.9) | 47.3 (8.5) | 46.1 (7.8) | 44.1 (6.7) | 46.1 (7.8) |
| Mean daily minimum °F (°C) | 35.3 (1.8) | 33.7 (0.9) | 34.2 (1.2) | 35.3 (1.8) | 38.4 (3.6) | 40.2 (4.6) | 39.6 (4.2) | 40.2 (4.6) | 39.4 (4.1) | 38.8 (3.8) | 38.9 (3.8) | 36.2 (2.3) | 37.5 (3.1) |
| Mean minimum °F (°C) | 28.1 (−2.2) | 27.3 (−2.6) | 28.5 (−1.9) | 29.8 (−1.2) | 32.6 (0.3) | 34.6 (1.4) | 34.4 (1.3) | 35.4 (1.9) | 34.3 (1.3) | 33.7 (0.9) | 32.0 (0.0) | 28.7 (−1.8) | 25.4 (−3.7) |
| Record low °F (°C) | 19 (−7) | 18 (−8) | 20 (−7) | 23 (−5) | 27 (−3) | 28 (−2) | 26 (−3) | 28 (−2) | 29 (−2) | 27 (−3) | 25 (−4) | 21 (−6) | 18 (−8) |
| Average precipitation inches (mm) | 2.48 (63) | 1.51 (38) | 1.75 (44) | 1.33 (34) | 1.00 (25) | 0.51 (13) | 1.16 (29) | 1.50 (38) | 1.36 (35) | 1.16 (29) | 1.78 (45) | 2.01 (51) | 17.55 (446) |
| Average snowfall inches (cm) | 0.0 (0.0) | 1.0 (2.5) | 0.3 (0.76) | 1.3 (3.3) | 0.0 (0.0) | 0.0 (0.0) | 0.0 (0.0) | 0.0 (0.0) | 0.0 (0.0) | 0.0 (0.0) | 0.0 (0.0) | 1.0 (2.5) | 3.7 (9.4) |
| Average precipitation days (≥ 0.01 in) | 4 | 5 | 6 | 5 | 4 | 3 | 4 | 5 | 5 | 5 | 5 | 4 | 55 |
Source 1: NOAA
Source 2: Western Climate Center (precipitation and snow 1955–2005)

=== Impacts on ecosystem ===
Hawai’i’s volcanoes have had an impact on the ecosystem throughout the years. Mauna Loa is an active volcano and has erupted many times, each time sending lava into the oceans and the forest. The hundreds of lava flows impact the surrounding land and vegetation within the region creating soil that is more nutrient dense. The climate of the island in combination with the lava flow has allowed for plant matter and other organic material to decompose faster. The flow of lava, rainfall, various elevations, and clouds release more nutrients and phosphorus as well. The Volcanoes National Park has been split into seven different zones depending on the elevation levels, forests found, coast, and mountains.

Over the years, plant matter that provides more nutrients has been collected by locals and used for religious and traditional purposes. There continues to be limits to what plants are collected and the quantity to ensure that the land and soil around Mauna Loa stays regulated.

See or edit raw graph data.

== Observatories ==
Atmospheric CO_{2} concentrations measured at the Mauna Loa Observatory.

The location of Mauna Loa has made it an important location for atmospheric monitoring by the Global Atmosphere Watch and other scientific observations. The Mauna Loa Solar Observatory (MLSO), located at 11,155 feet (3,400 m) on the northern slope of the mountain, has long been prominent in observations of the Sun. The NOAA Mauna Loa Observatory (MLO) is located close by. From its location well above local human-generated influences, the MLO monitors the global atmosphere, including the greenhouse gas carbon dioxide. Measurements are adjusted to account for local outgassing of CO_{2} from the volcano.

The Yuan-Tseh Lee Array for Microwave Background Anisotropy (AMiBA) sits at an elevation of 11,155 feet (3,400 m). It was established in October 2006 by the Academia Sinica Institute of Astronomy and Astrophysics (ASIAA) to examine cosmic microwave background radiation.

== See also ==
- HI-SEAS
- List of mountain peaks of the United States
  - List of volcanoes of the United States
    - List of mountain peaks of Hawaii
- List of Ultras of Oceania
- List of Ultras of the United States
- Olympus Mons – The tallest volcano in the Solar System
- Olaa Forest on Mauna Loa, in the Hawaiʻi Volcanoes National Park
