= 1975 eruption of Mauna Loa =

Volcanic eruption in Hawaii

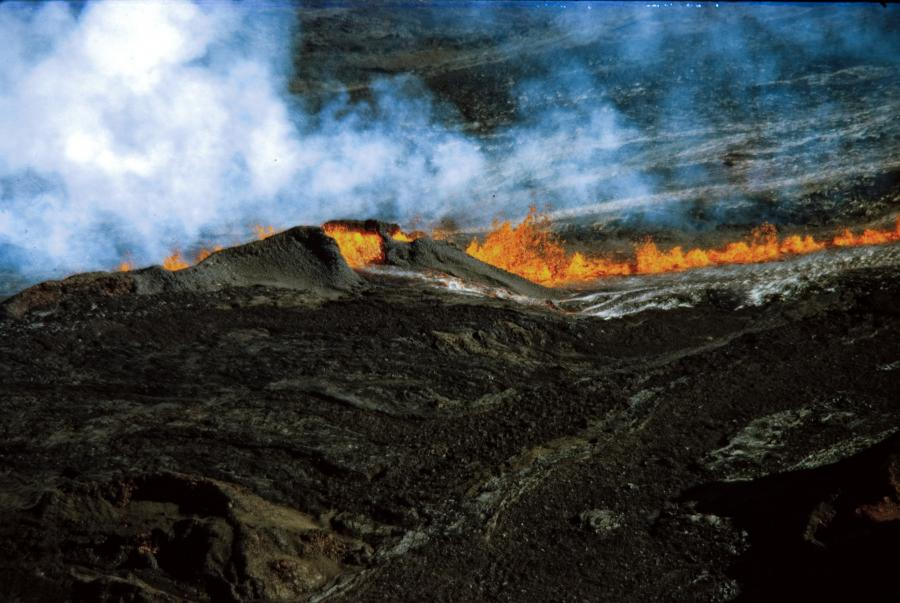
- Volcano: Mauna Loa
- Start date: July 5, 1975
- End date: July 6, 1975
- End time: 7:30 p.m. HST
- Type: Hawaiian
- Location: Hawaii, Hawaiian Islands; 19°28′03″N 155°35′29″W
- Volume: 0.030 km^{3} (0.0072 cu mi)
- VEI: 0

The 1975 eruption of Mauna Loa was a short-lived Hawaiian eruption that followed 25 years of quiescence at the Hawaiian volcano Mauna Loa. The eruption began just before midnight on July 5 and involved fissures extending across the length of Moku‘āweoweo, Mauna Loa's summit caldera, and into the upper ends of the volcano's northeast and southwest rift zones. After only 6 hours, activity in Moku‘āweoweo and on the southwest rift zone ended, but lava fountaining continued along the northeast rift zone until 7:30 p.m. on July 6, when all activity ceased.

== Precursors ==
No unusual activity was noted on the Mauna Loa seismograms during the early evening of July 5; seismicity was at relatively low levels. At 23:18 HST, however, seismic alarms, signifying prolonged high-amplitude volcanic tremor, were activated in homes of Hawaiian Volcano Observatory (HVO) staff. The tremor had been first recorded by three seismometers near Moku‘āweoweo at 22:51 HST. Staff reached HVO at 23:30 HST and saw that harmonic tremor was being recorded on all Mauna Loa and Kīlauea seismographs. Hawaiʻi Volcanoes National Park and civil defense authorities were alerted to the imminent probability of a Mauna Loa eruption.

== Eruption ==
At 23:42 HST, a small glow was noted above the southwest end of Moku‘āweoweo. Within one minute the glow extended across the entire summit area and a fume cloud more than 3,300 ft (1,000 m) high was illuminated with a bright orange-red glow from the unseen lava fountains on the caldera floor. A light airplane with two HVO staff members aboard reached the summit area on July 6 at 01:48 HST; a line of lava fountains 66 to 164 ft (20 to 50 m) high crossed the entire floor of Moku‘āweoweo at this time and extended about 0.62 mi (1.00 km) down the southwest rift zone. Lava cascades 300 ft (91 m) high were pouring into three pit craters on the upper southwest rift zone. Lava flows were rapidly advancing to the west and southwest from the southwest rift zone vents.

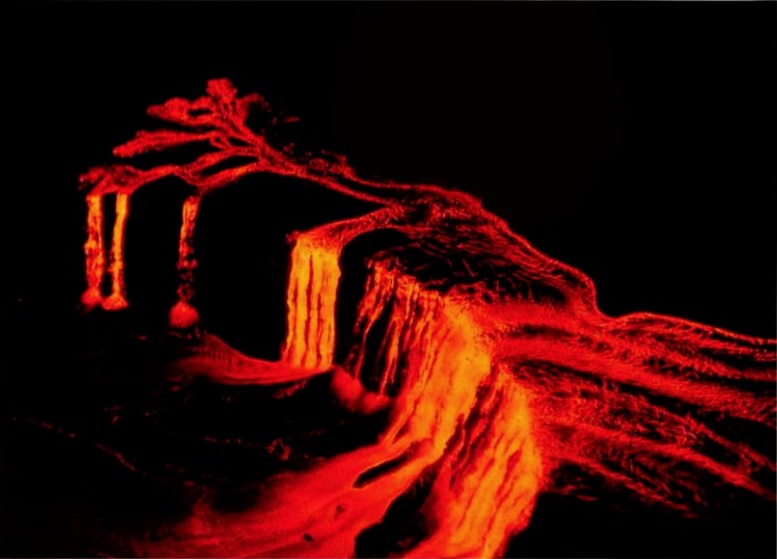
Aerial view of lava cascades into Lua Hou, upper southwest rift zone

The eruptive fissures extended rapidly northeastward, across North Pit, and into the upper northeast rift zone at 02:25 HST. At 02:45 HST lava from the North Pit vents began cascading into another summit pit crater, Lua Poholo. By 03:15 HST, the lava fountains on the southwest rift zone and within Moku‘āweoweo were waning, and the lava flows moving to the west and southwest had stagnated. Fountains continued to migrate eastward along the northeast rift zone, but by dawn eruptive activity was largely restricted to echelon vents near the northeast rift zone at 12,400 ft (3,800 m) elevation.

A voluminous a'a flow moved about 1.2 mph (1.9 km/h) down the north flank of Mauna Loa and threatened to cut the paved access road and powerlines to the Mauna Loa Observatory. At about 07:15 HST, fountains feeding this a'a flow subsided and it soon stopped about 330 ft (100 m) from the observatory road, having traveled 32 mi (51 km). Fountaining continued at greatly diminished levels throughout the day, but ceased by nightfall. Approximately 30,000,000 m^{3} (1.1×10^{9} cu ft) of lava had been erupted and 13.5 km^{2} (145,000,000 sq ft) of the Mauna Loa summit area had been covered.
