= ʻĀinapō Trail =

Hiking trail in Hawaii, United States

- U.S. National Register of Historic Places
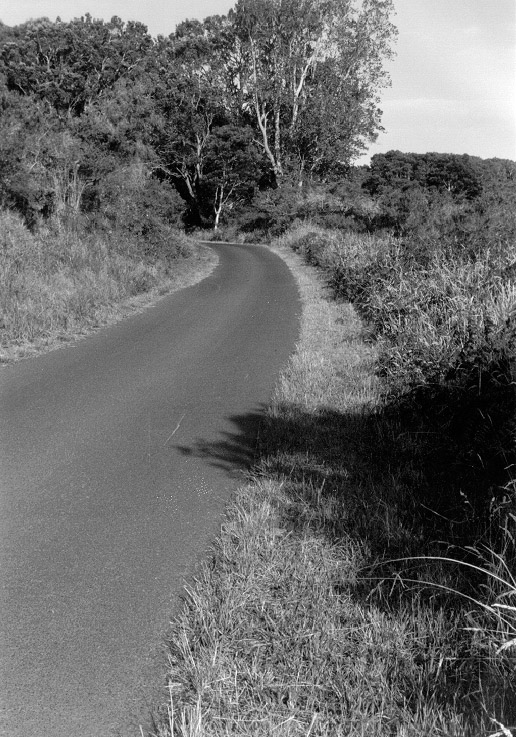

- Location within Hawaii
- Nearest city: Mauna Loa, Hawaii
- Coordinates: 19°27′39″N 155°34′39″W
- Built: 1870
- NRHP reference No.: 74000290
- Added to NRHP: August 30, 1974

The ʻĀinapō Trail was the primary route to the summit of Mauna Loa from prehistory to 1916. The trail began on the southeast flank at 2000 feet of elevation and reached Mokuaweoweo, the summit crater, at 13,200 feet (4,000 m). It was sometimes called Menzies Trail after Archibald Menzies who was the first recorded outsider to climb the mountain in 1794. The Ainapo Trail was added to the National Register of Historic Places on August 30, 1974.

== Early history ==
This 35-mile (55 km) route from the small community of Kapapala (near present-day Pahala) had been used in Ancient Hawaii to make offerings to Pele during eruptions. The name comes from ʻāina pō in the Hawaiian language which means "darkened land", due to heavy clouds at the mid-elevation sections. At higher elevations above the clouds, the landscape is dry and barren lava rock. The climb is from about 2,000 feet (610 m) at Kapapala to above 13,200 feet (4,000 m) at the summit of Mokuaweoweo. The trail was furnished with camps which provided rest areas and an opportunity to acclimate to the increasing altitude. The camps consisted of temporary huts, or rock shelters, one of which was in a lava tube. In areas where the trail was hard to discern, rock cairns marked the way, placed to be visible along the skyline as travelers moved upwards.

In 1794, Archibald Menzies, a naturalist on the Vancouver Expedition, used the trail and about 100 Hawaiian porters to reach the summit and measure its elevation with a barometer. Lieutenant Charles Wilkes of the 1840 United States Exploring Expedition first attempted to use a shorter route, but resorted to the Ainapo trail after making much slower progress than he planned in his trip to the summit. The trail was widened in 1870 and again in 1913 when horses and mules started bringing more visitors to the summit.

== Decline and revival ==
In 1915 the United States Army built a new trail directly from Kilauea Crater to Mokuaweoweo which was maintained by the National Park Service when the Hawaii Volcanoes National Park was formed in 1916. The historic route fell into disuse since the lower elevations covered private land used for ranching and farming. Today, only the section of about 11 miles (18 km) above 11,650 feet (3,550 m) remains in its original condition. The 200 feet (61 m) on either side of the trail in this area was added to the National Register of Historic Places on August 30, 1974, as site 74000290 and is state historic site 10-52-5501.

In the late 1990s a modern shelter was built at a historic camp site at an elevation of 7,750 feet (2,360 m). The lower area of Kapapala is now a private ranch, although hunting and camping can be arranged. Modern trails can now be taken from a trailhead on Ainapo road north of Hawaii Belt Road at coordinates 19°20′18″N 155°23′43″W, through the Kapapala State Forest Reserve, to the historic section of the Ainapo trail, all the way to the summit.
