= Nīnole Hills =

Hills in Hawaii, U.S.

Coordinates: 19.1458°N 155.5839°W

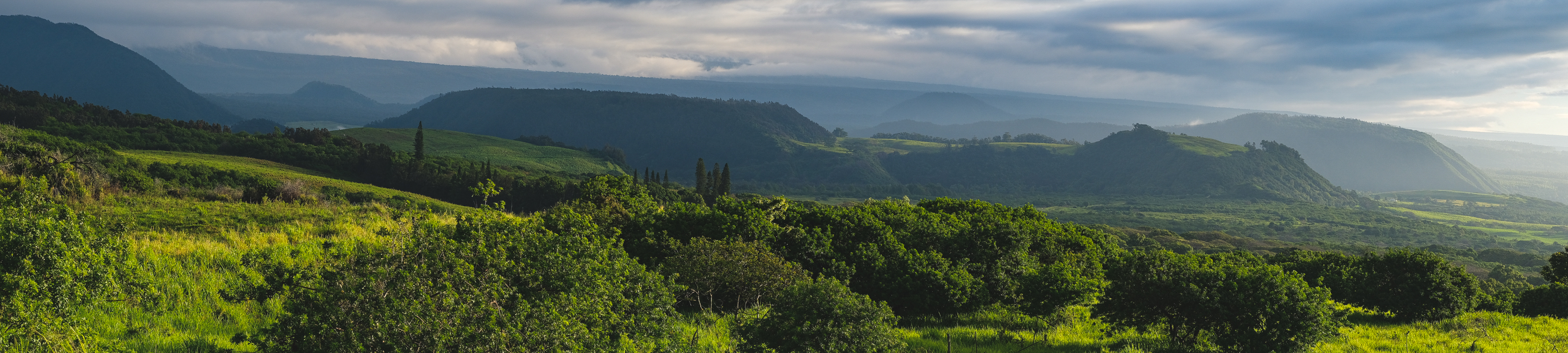
Nīnole Hills

The Nīnole Hills, also known as the Nīnole Volcanic Series, are steep eroded hills of shield basalts on the south side of the Island of Hawaii. Recent data suggests that these hills are either the remnants of large escarpments that pre-date the Mauna Loa volcano (the largest active volcano in the world), or uplifted blocks from the oldest parts of the Mauna Loa fault system.

The Ninole Hills are remains of the top rim of a big deep hollow left when the prehistoric Punaluʻu landslide slid away. The rim over time eroded into deep canyons as lava from Mauna Loa ran down into the hollow and slowly filled it instead of burying the rim area, until now parts of the tops of the inter-canyon ridges are still unburied.

It is apparent from the ruggedness of the eroded hills that they are much older than the surrounding landscape. Most of the surface of Mauna Loa is thought to have formed within the last 4,000 years, but the Ninole Hills are estimated to be between 100,000 and 200,000 years old. During this period there seem to have been massive failures in the support of the south wall of Mauna Loa, resulting in debris landslides that removed chunks out of the volcano, revealing remnants of the older sections of Mauna Loa.
