= Ala Kahakai National Historic Trail =

Historic Place in Hawaii County, Hawaii

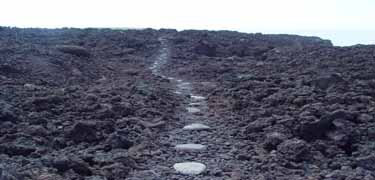
- Restored section of the trail

- Location within Hawaii
- Location: Hawaii, US
- Nearest city: Kailua, Hawaii County, Hawaii
- Coordinates: 18°54′40″N 155°40′52″W
- Length: 175 mi (282 km)
- Established: 2000
- Governing body: National Park Service
- Website: Ala Kahakai National Historic Trail

Ala Kahakai National Historic Trail is a 175-mile (282 km) long trail located on the island of Hawaii. It is not yet a single continuous trail, but can be accessed at several broken segments along the coastline of the Big Island. The trail was established to access the traditional Ancient Hawaiian culture along with the natural geology of the island. The trail was established 14 November 2000 as a National Historic Trail which is managed under the National Park Service. The trail has received funds from the Land and Water Conservation Fund.

== Geography ==
Ala kaha kai means "shoreline trail" in the Hawaiian language. The trail follows the coastline over ancient fishermen's trails through over 200 ahupuaʻa, the traditional sea to mountain land divisions. In ancient times travel would often cover both land, and sea in canoes for portions of the journey. It passes through both public and private lands, providing access to numerous beaches and resorts.

Much of the trail receives only limited maintenance and sections have been eroded or developed into roads. Only the one section of the trail has signage.

The Northern end of the trail is in Upolu Point in the North Kohala District at the Moʻokini Heiau, coordinates 20.25767°N 155.87707°W.

A part of the trail called Ala Loa (meaning "long trail" in the Hawaiian Language, another name for the same network of trails) was added to the state registry of historic places as site 10-10-11,334 on January 14, 1989, and to the National Register of Historic Places as number 87001127 in 1987. This runs from Kiholo Bay to Kalahuipauaʻa near Puakō.

After passing through the west side of island, the trail ends in Hawaiʻi Volcanoes National Park. Starting in 2002, a comprehensive management plan and environmental impact statement were prepared and published in 2008.

The final comprehensive action plan was released by the National Park Service in May 2009. The plan is a guide for the comprehensive management of the trail for fifteen years following the plan’s release. The plan provides a historical overview of the trail’s significance for the ancient Hawaiian people and establishes a framework for trail maintenance and resource protection.

== Trail map ==
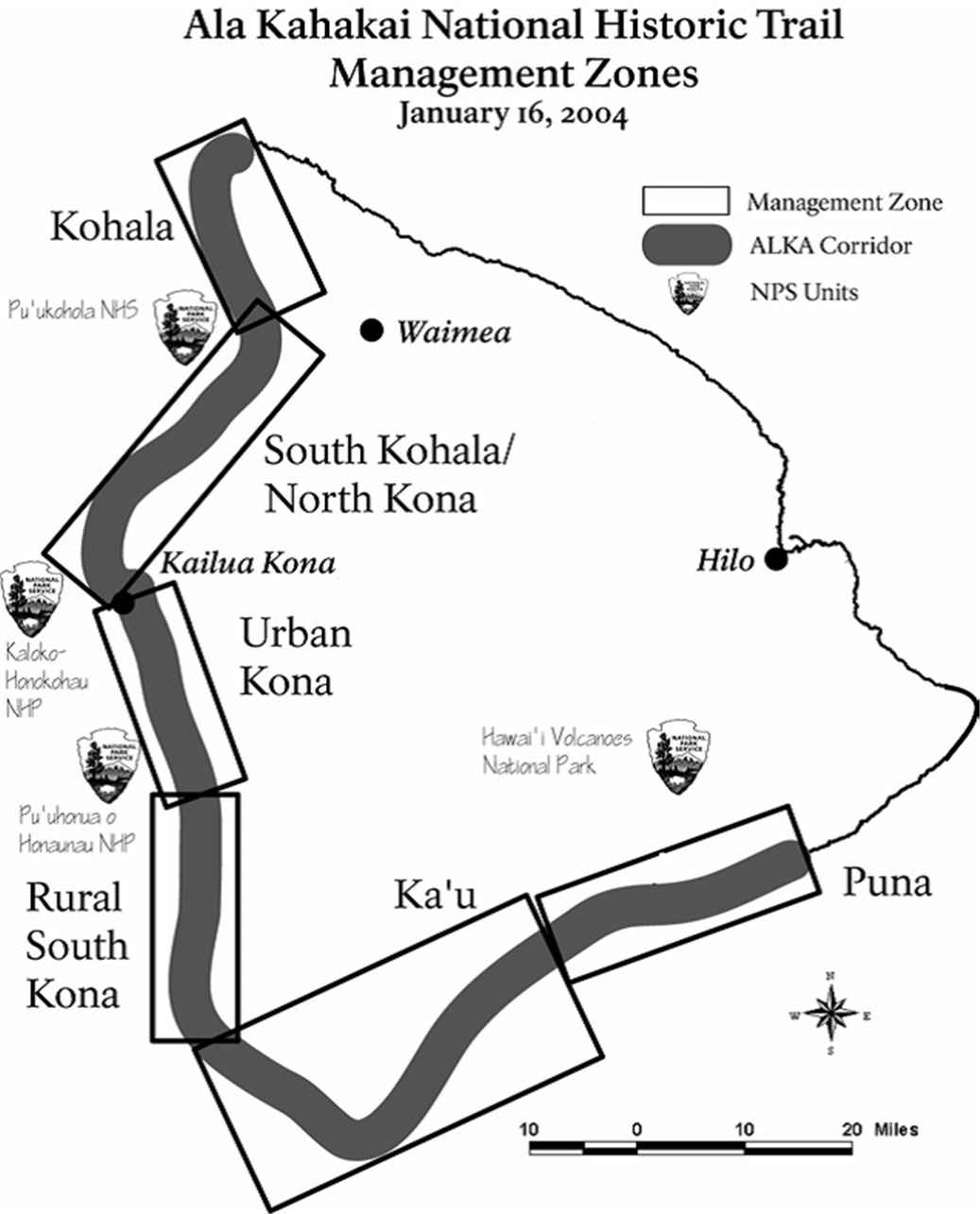
Map of the trail zones, from National Park Service

== See also ==
- Hawaii Belt Road
