= Kīholo Bay =

Bay in Hawaii, United States

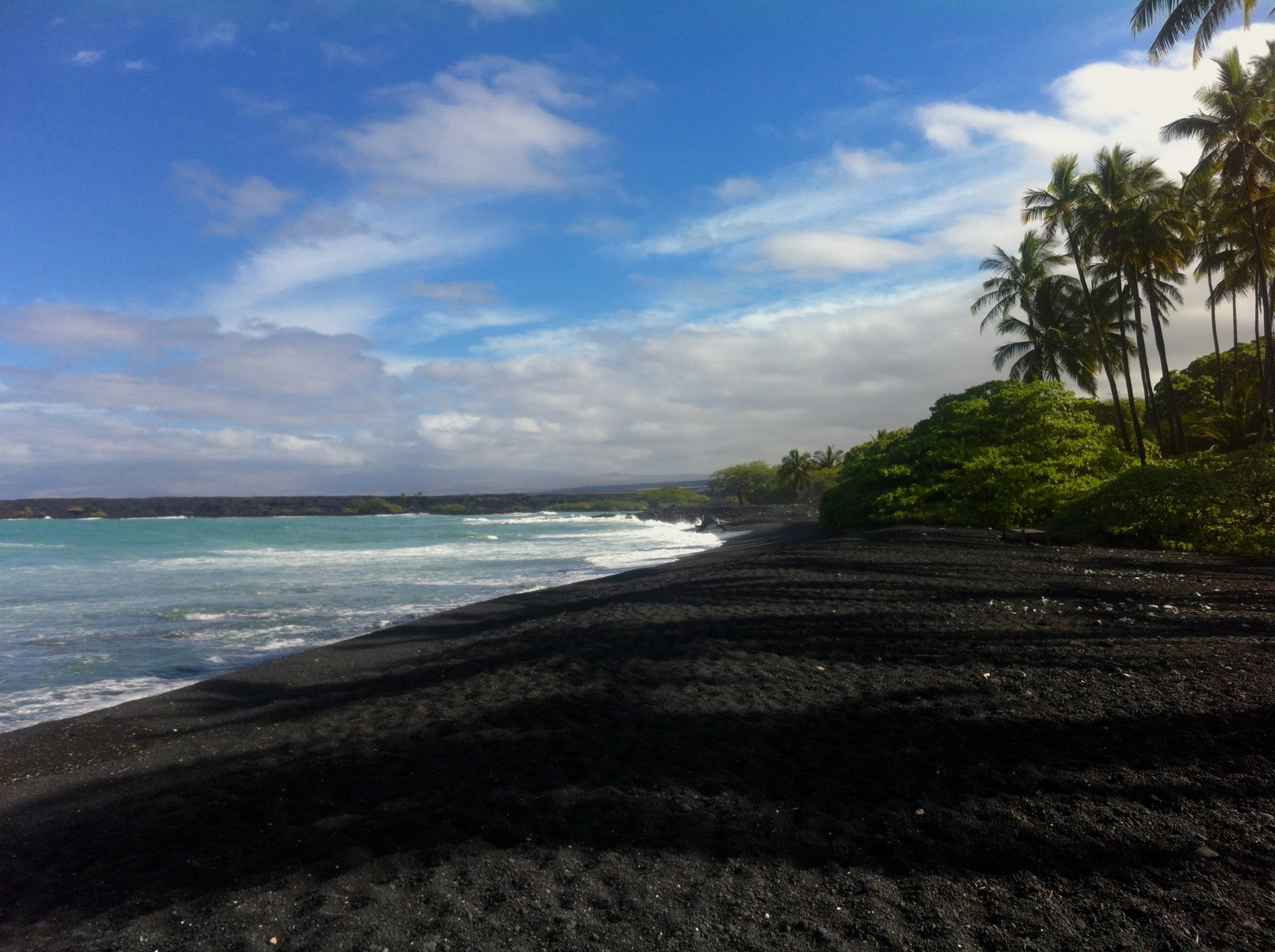
- A photo of the black beaches of Kiholo Bay.

- Location within Hawaii
- Location: Kona District, Hawaii, United States
- Coordinates: 19°51′34″N 155°55′59″W

Kīholo Bay is located in the ahupuaʻa (historic land division) of Puʻu Waʻawaʻa in the North Kona District on the Big Island of Hawaii. the land surrounding the bay is flanked to the South by a lava flow from Mount Hualalai ca. 1801 and another flow from Mauna Loa in 1859. The land surrounding Kīholo Bay is under the authority of Hawaiʻi State Parks. Approximately 2 miles long (3.2 km), it is one of the island's largest bays. Kīholo Bay is now a popular site for tourists and nature enthusiasts.

== History ==
Originating in 1820, Kīholo Bay was created as a man-made fishing pond for King Kamehameha the Great. The recreational area was bordered by rock walls 6 feet tall and 20 feet wide. These walls were destroyed in 1859 when an eruption from Mauna Loa, located 48 km away, caused the pond to be submerged in a flow of lava. The hardened lava from the eruption created the characteristic black pebble beaches of Kīholo Bay. The large stones that surround the tide pools are remnants of the walls built by Kamehameha. This historic area is now under government regulation and protection as the Kīholo State Park Reserve.

=== 2006 earthquake ===
On Sunday, October 15, 2006, Kīholo Bay was struck by a 6.7 magnitude earthquake followed by a 6.0 magnitude earthquake seven minutes after the first. While no fatalities occurred due to the incident, over 60 residential buildings were red tagged by officials. The entire island suffered over $100 million worth of damage as a result of the earthquake.

== Queen's Bath ==
Kīholo Bay was also home to "Queen's Bath" a large tide pool on the Kona Coast. The original Queen's Bath, located in Kalapana, was formed by a collapsed lava tube that filled with fresh water from a nearby natural spring. Appropriately named, only ancient Hawaiian royalty, also known as the Ali'i, were allowed to enter the pool which was used as a place for bathing and relaxation. The original pool was destroyed in 1987 by a volcanic eruption from Kīlauea. After this site was destroyed, another pool located on the island of Kauai became the new "Queen's Bath".

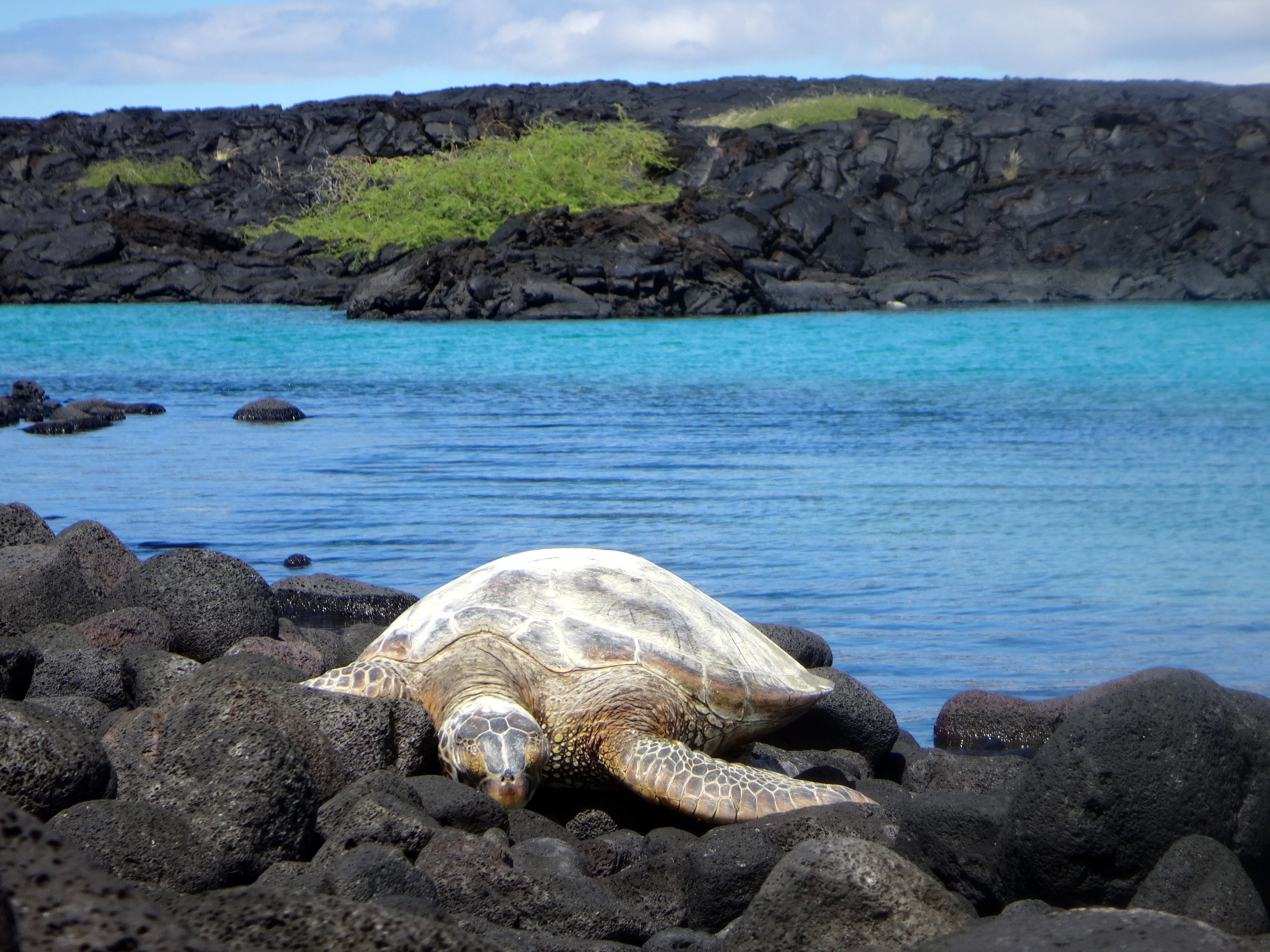
Sea turtle basking on the rocks of Wainanali'i Pond

== Wainanali'i Pond ==
The northern end of the bay encompasses Wainanaliʻi Pond – a unique body of water wedged between the hardened lava of the Mauna Loa eruption and a coconut grove. Also known as Hawaii's Blue Lagoon, the pond is an oasis for green sea turtles who visit the site daily to feed and bask on the rocks. While the turtles are a popular attraction for tourists visiting the Bay, they are protected under Hawaiian state law and may not be disturbed.

== Conservation Efforts ==
=== International Efforts ===
Although the majority of Kīholo Bay is public property, some residential areas of the bay are privately owned and unavailable for research or conservation efforts. In 2011, a large portion of the privately owned property in Kīholo Bay was donated to the Nature Conservancy by Angus Mitchell. Mitchell had inherited $6.5 million worth of property in Kīholo Bay from his father, Paul Mitchell. According to the Nature Conservancy, up to five million gallons of submarine groundwater move from Kīholo Bay to coastal waters each day supporting marine wildlife and coral reef habitats. In an effort to conserve the natural state of the bay, the organization is focused on removing invasive vegetation and existing sediment currently in the water. To determine how these efforts are affecting the overall condition of the area, the conservatory records data on water quality and abundance of wildlife in the bay.

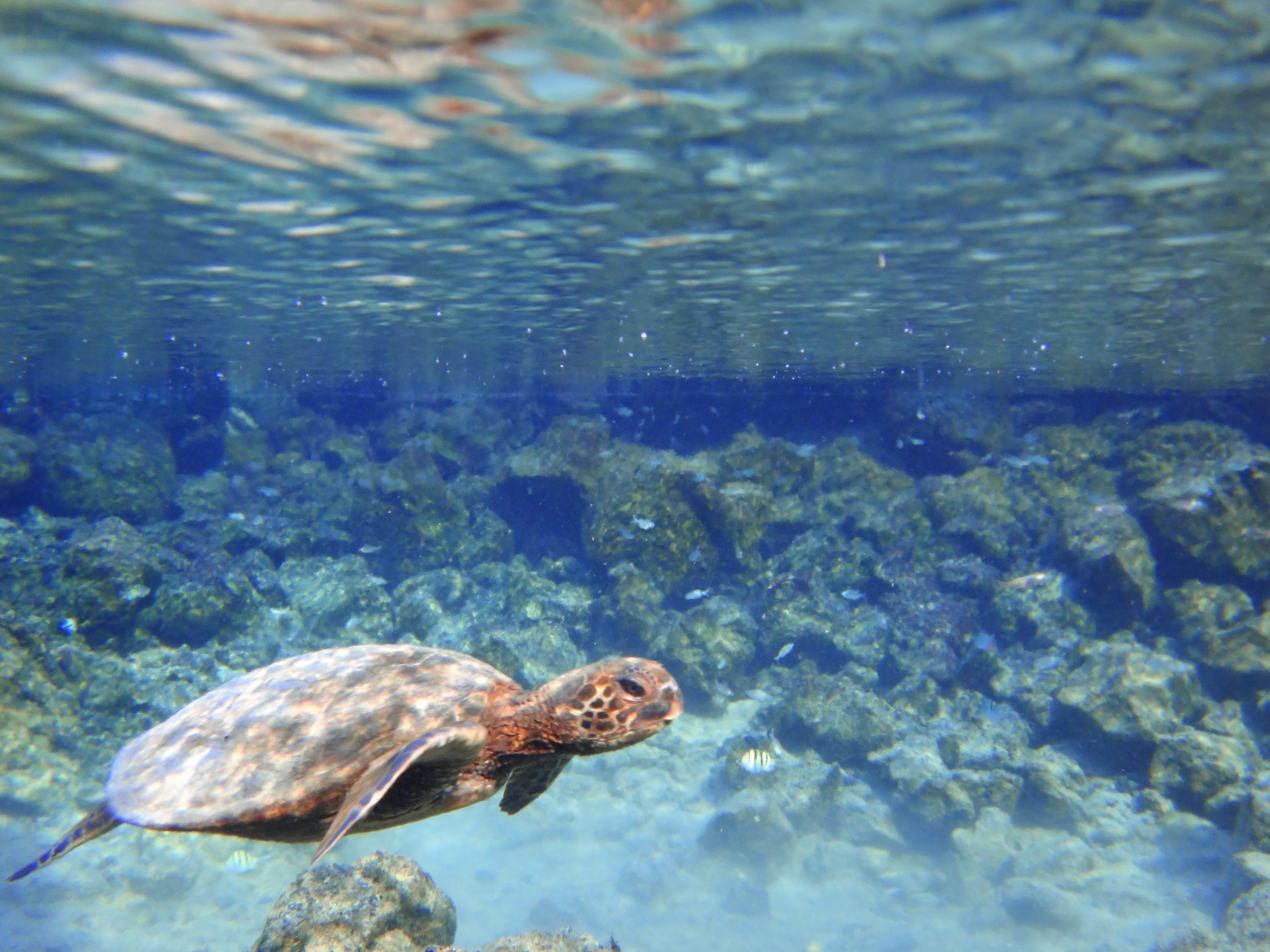
Sea turtles are a primary concern of species protection within Kiholo Bay.

Another initiative involved in the protection of Kīholo Bay is Conservation International, an organization dedicated to improving ocean health. Conservation International is primarily concerned with providing seafood to local communities while maintaining sustainable fishing efforts. A study done on seafood security in Kīholo Bay determined that the coral reef habitat provided upwards of 30,000 meals per year. While only 8.5% of these meals are part of commercial harvest (the majority of food generated by Kīholo Bay is consumed by herbivores and planktivores living in and around the bay), Kīholo Bay's annual market value was determined to be $78,432. In order to maintain these numbers, the organization aims to improve small-scale fisheries management by restoring marine habitats and promoting sustainable, local seafood.

=== Ulupono Initiative ===
The Nature Conservancy and Conservation International work together to protect the Kiholo Marine Area and are supported by the Ulupono Initiative. The Ulupono Initiative raises donations through the Hawaii Community Foundation. These funds are used to support the rehabilitation of fisheries on the island and conduct studies to determine how community efforts to restore protected areas can be maximized.

=== The State of Hawaii ===
Kīholo Bay is also protected under the State of Hawaii's Division of Aquatic Resources and Division of State Parks. Under the Division of Aquatic Resources, Hawaiian law states that it is permitted for individuals with aquarium fish permits to use small-meshed nets only if these nets are monitored at all times. It is prohibited for any individual to use gill nets or attempt to feed fish within the fisheries management area. The fisheries management area extends from Nāwaikūlua Point to Hou Point and includes Wainanali'i Pond.

The Division of State Parks outlines that while camping is permitted on weekends many activities including driving motorized vehicles, smoking, littering and consuming alcoholic beverages are prohibited within the bay. Permitted activities include swimming, snorkeling, hiking and beachgoing.
