= Hawaiian eruption =

Effusive volcanic eruption

Hawaiian eruption: 1, ash plume; 2, lava fountain; 3, crater; 4, lava lake; 5, fumarole; 6, lava flow; 7, layers of lava and ash; 8, stratum; 9, sill; 10, magma conduit; 11, magma chamber; 12, dike

A Hawaiian eruption is a type of volcanic eruption where lava flows from the vent in a relatively gentle, low level eruption; it is so named because it is characteristic of Hawaiian volcanoes. Typically they are effusive eruptions, with basaltic magmas of low viscosity, low content of gases, and high temperature at the vent. Very small amounts of volcanic ash are produced. This type of eruption occurs most often at hotspot volcanoes such as Kīlauea on Hawaii's big island and in Iceland, though it can occur near subduction zones (e.g. Medicine Lake Volcano in California) and rift zones. Hawaiian eruptions may occur along fissure vents, such as during the eruption of Mauna Loa in 1950, or at a central vent, such as during the 1959 eruption in Kīlauea Iki Crater, which created a lava fountain 580 meters (1,900 ft) high and formed a 38-meter cone named Puʻu Puaʻi. In fissure-type eruptions, lava spurts from a fissure on the volcano's rift zone and feeds lava streams that flow downslope. In central-vent eruptions, a fountain of lava can spurt to a height of 300 meters or more (heights of 1600 meters were reported for the 1986 eruption of Mount Mihara on Izu Ōshima, Japan).

Hawaiian eruptions usually start from an increase earthquake activity in a localized region followed with the formation of cracks in the ground from which a curtain of incandescent lava or several closely spaced lava fountains appear. The lava can overflow the fissure and form ʻaʻā or pāhoehoe style of flows. When such an eruption from a central cone is protracted, it can form lightly sloped shield volcanoes, for example Mauna Loa or Skjaldbreiður in Iceland. Geologists can predict where new eruptions will take place by tracking the earthquakes that precede the eruptions.

== Petrology of basalts in Hawaii ==
The key factors in generating a Hawaiian eruption are basaltic magma and a low percentage of dissolved water (less than one percent). The lower the water content, the more peaceful is the resulting flow. Almost all lava that comes from Hawaiian volcanoes is basalt in composition. Hawaiian basalts that make up almost all of the islands are tholeiite. These rocks are similar but not identical to those that are produced at ocean ridges. Basalt relatively richer in sodium and potassium (more alkaline) has erupted at the undersea volcano of Kamaʻehuakanaloa (formerly Lōʻihi) at the extreme southeastern end of the volcanic chain, and these rocks may be typical of early stages in the "evolution" of all Hawaiian islands. In the late stages of eruption of individual volcanoes, more alkaline basalt also was erupted, and in the very late stages after a period of erosion, rocks of unusual composition such as nephelinite were produced in very small amounts. These variations in magma composition have been investigated in great detail, in part to try to understand how mantle plumes may work.

== Safety ==
Hawaiian eruptions are considered less dangerous than other types of volcanic eruptions because they produce little ash, and lava flows are generally slow-moving. However, they can still cause injuries or deaths.

In 1993, a photographer attempting to take pictures of a lava ocean entry died, and several tourists were injured, when a lava bench collapsed. In 2000, two people were found dead near a lava ocean entry from Kīlauea, likely killed by laze. Sulfur dioxide emissions can also be deadly, especially to people suffering from respiratory ailments. In 2018, 23 people on a tour boat were injured by a steam explosion and lava bombs at a lava ocean entry.

== See also ==
- Hawaiian Volcano Observatory
