= Rift zone =

Part of a volcano where a set of linear cracks form

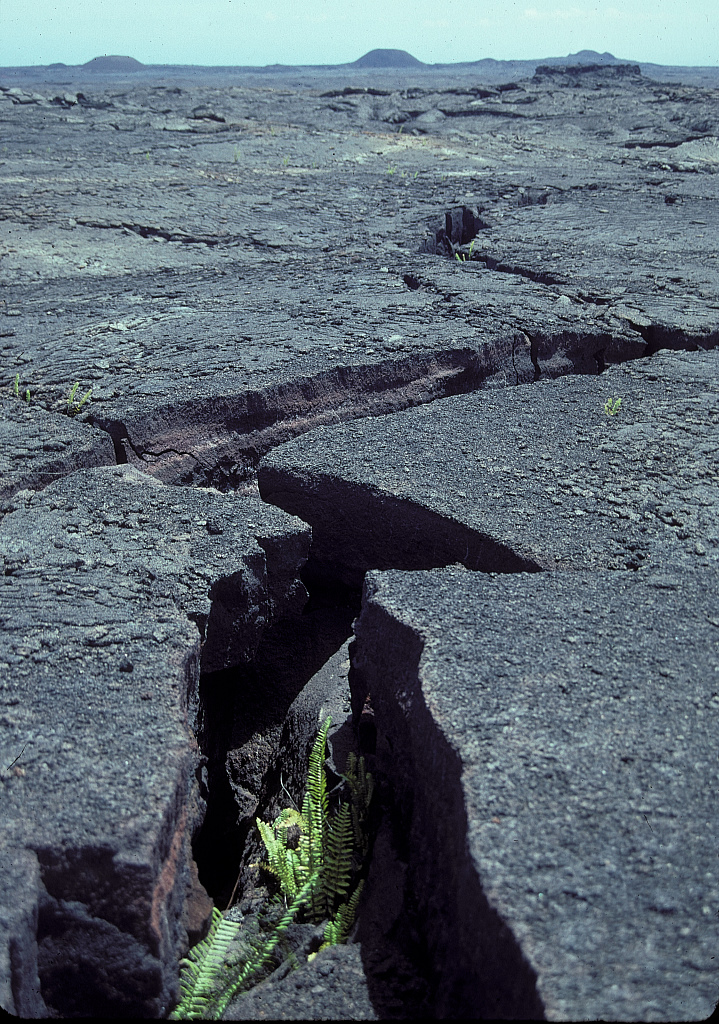
East Rift Zone on Kīlauea, Hawaiʻi

A rift zone is a feature of some volcanoes, especially shield volcanoes, in which a set of linear cracks (or rifts) develops in a volcanic edifice, typically forming into two or three well-defined regions along the flanks of the vent. Believed to be primarily caused by internal and gravitational stresses generated by magma emplacement within and across various regions of the volcano, rift zones allow the intrusion of magmatic dykes into the slopes of the volcano itself. The addition of these magmatic materials usually contributes to the further rifting of the slope, in addition to generating fissure eruptions from those dykes that reach the surface. It is the grouping of these fissures, and the dykes that feed them, that serves to delineate where and whether a rift zone is to be defined. The accumulated lava of repeated eruptions from rift zones along with the endogenous growth created by magma intrusions causes these volcanoes to have an elongated shape. Perhaps the best example of this is Mauna Loa, which in Hawaiian means "long mountain", and which features two very well defined rift zones extending tens of kilometers outward from the central vent.

== Formation ==
Rift zones are characterized by the close grouping of intrusive dykes and extrusive fissures extending outward along a relatively narrow band from the area of a central vent. The internal extensional forces and isostatic loading generated by intruding magma volumes (either associated with the magma chamber or subsequent dyke and sill formation extending outward from that chamber), in conjunction with accumulation of erupted materials, contribute to the mass and slope of the forming edifice. It is the weight of the edifice exceeding its material strength, with the additional stresses of the magma inflating the internal regions of the edifice, that can generate the initial cracking around a developing volcanic summit. Additionally, tectonic activity such as normal faulting is also commonly associated with formation of rifts along volcanic flanks. Following the path of least resistance, subsequent magmatic dykes form along and within these initial cracks, causing additional stresses to be imparted to the local materials of the edifice, which in turn generate new rifts for the magma to flow towards. In this way, established rift zones can potentially be self-sustaining geologic features along the flanks of the given volcanic vent. The orientation of this rifting is largely dependent on the gravitational and tectonic stresses at play. Basaltic shield volcanoes typically feature two main rift zones, situated with angles of 120° between in ideal situations. On shield volcanoes forming from level seafloor without neighboring vents, flank rifting occurs more evenly distributed around the vent. However, where the flanks of a volcano may be supported on one side by the presence of a pre-existing feature, or burdened with various planes of weakness, rift zone formation promulgates according to down-slope pull of gravity.

== Structure ==
The infill of magmas in the form of dykes helps to define the shape of a volcano. A higher frequency of intrusive events along rift zones leads to elongated topographies of the affected edifices. Mathematical models show how the presence of rift zones contributes to a central horizontal bulge or ridge parallel to the orientation of the rifts. This same modelling shows how this central bulge is dependent on the ratio between rift zone length and depth of the magma sources, with longer fissures over shallower sources being more positively associated with very elongated topographies of the associated flanks. Occasionally, fissure eruptions associated with rift zones can actually evolve into new vents along the volcanic edifice, generating lava flows lasting for months or longer. These lava flows add surface materials to the slopes of the volcano, extending the slopes outward in a general flattening of the morphology of the flank. The extensional character of these events can contribute to flank instability and mass wasting events where whole sections of the volcanic edifice can collapse along rift zone boundaries. These mass wasting events can affect the dyke formations and orientations as the mass of the edifice shifts, which can have profound impacts on the structural development of the edifice, while also potentially creating many volcanic hazards, such as tsunamis and dramatic shifts in directions of lava flows, to unsuspecting communities.

Volcanologist George P.L. Walker stated that rift zones were common in most volcanoes around the world, regardless of their type and formation. Walker put forward the idea that, absent any obvious signs of rifting on the surface, the presence of other volcanic features that are also associated with dyke intrusions (such as elongated cinder cones and linearly-aligned fissure vents) should also be taken to represent the presence of a rift zone-like processes in the given region. Therefore, rift zones of various lengths and widths can be tentatively identified on many stratovolcanoes and monogenetic lava fields in addition to classic Hawaiian shield volcanoes.

== Examples ==
- Hawaii: Most Hawaiian volcanoes have two or sometimes three rift zones.
  - Māhukona
  - Mauna Loa
  - Hualalai
  - Kilauea
- Galapagos Islands
- Canary Islands
  - La Palma
  - El Hierro
- Newberry Volcano, Oregon
- Craters of the Moon, Idaho

== See also ==
- Fracture (geology)
- Lateral eruption
