= List of volcanoes in the Hawaiian–Emperor seamount chain =

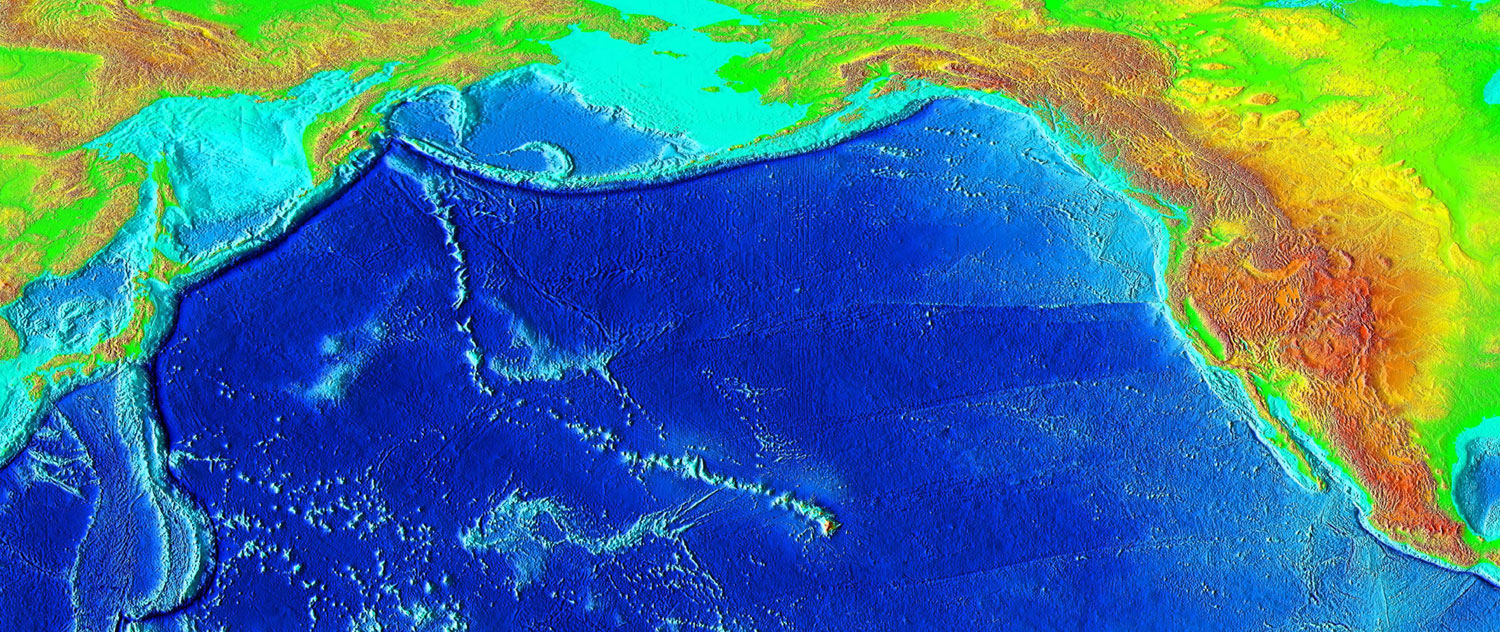
The Hawaiian–Emperor seamount chain. The two straight sections, the Emperor and Hawaiian strands, are separated by a large L-shaped bend at the Northwestern Hawaiian islands.

Map of the youngest Hawaiian Islands showing progression in selected erupted lava ages along the island chain (Ma = million years)

Map of the Hawaiian Islands and some of the Emperor seamounts showing progression in selected erupted lava ages along the chain (Ma = million years)

The Hawaiian–Emperor seamount chain is a series of volcanoes and seamounts extending about 6,200 km (3,900 mi) across the Pacific Ocean. (Note: The great-circle distance, or shortest distance from Kamaʻehuakanaloa Seamount at the southern end of the chain to Meiji Seamount at the northern end of the chain, via the chain bend at Daikakuji Seamount, is 5,976 km (3,713 mi). (source: NOAA Latitude/Longitude Distance Calculator).)

The chain was produced by the movement of the ocean crust over the Hawaiʻi hotspot, an upwelling of hot rock from the Earth's mantle.

As the oceanic crust moves the volcanoes farther away from their source of magma, their eruptions become less frequent and less powerful until they eventually cease to erupt altogether. At that point, erosion of the volcano and subsidence of the seafloor cause the volcano to gradually diminish.

As the volcano sinks and erodes, it first becomes an atoll island and then an atoll. Further subsidence causes the volcano to sink below the sea surface, becoming a seamount. Once a seamount is 600 m (2,000 ft) or more under the surface, it is also classed as a guyot. This list documents the most significant volcanoes in the chain, ordered by distance from the hotspot, but there are many others that have yet to be properly studied.

The chain can be divided into three subsections. The first, the main windward Hawaiian islands consist of the eight youngest and easternmost Hawaiian islands. This is the youngest part of the chain and includes volcanoes with ages ranging from 400,000 years to 5.1 million years. The island of Hawaiʻi comprises five volcanoes, of which two (Kilauea and Mauna Loa) are still active. Kamaʻehuakanaloa Seamount (formerly Lōʻihi) continues to grow offshore, and is the only known volcano in the chain in the submarine pre-shield stage.

The second part of the chain is composed of the Northwestern Hawaiian Islands, collectively referred to as the Leeward isles, the constituents of which are between 7.2 and 27.7 million years old. Erosion has long since overtaken volcanic activity at these islands, and most of them are atolls, atoll islands, and extinct islands. They contain many of the most northerly atolls in the world, including Kure Atoll, the northernmost atoll in the world.

The oldest and most heavily eroded part of the chain are the Emperor seamounts, which are 39 to 85 million years old.

The Emperor and Hawaiian chains are separated by a large L-shaped bend that causes the orientations of the chains to differ by about 60 degrees. This bend was long attributed to a relatively sudden change in the direction of plate motion, but research conducted in 2003 suggests that it was the movement of the hotspot itself that caused the bend. As of 2006, the issue is still under debate.

All of the volcanoes in this part of the chain have long since subsided below sea level, becoming seamounts and guyots (see also: the seamount and guyot stages of Hawaiian volcanoes). Many of the volcanoes are named after former emperors of Japan. The seamount chain extends to the West Pacific, and terminates at the Kuril–Kamchatka Trench, a subduction zone at the border of Russia.

== Hawaiian archipelago ==
Name	Island	Last eruption	Coordinates	Age (years)	Notes
Kamaʻehuakanaloa Seamount (formerly Lōʻihi)	Seamount	1996 (active)	18.92°N 155.27°W	400,000	The seamount is a submarine volcano approximately 35 km (22 mi) southeast of Hawaiʻi. It may eventually breach sea level and become the newest Hawaiian island.
Kīlauea	Big Island	2021–ongoing (active)	19°25′N 155°17′W	300,000–600,000	Kīlauea is considered one of the most active volcanoes on Earth. Kīlauea, was in near-continuous eruption on its East Rift Zone from January 3, 1983, to September 4, 2018, making it the longest-lived rift-zone eruption of the last six centuries.
Mauna Loa	Big Island	2022-ongoing (active)	19°28′46″N 155°36′10″W	700,000–1 million	Largest subaerial volcano on Earth
Hualālai	Big Island	1800–1801 (active)	19°41′32″N 155°52′02″W	> 300,000	Lies on the western edge of the Big Island
Mauna Kea	Big Island	4460 BP (dormant)	19°49′14″N 155°28′05″W	~1 million	World's tallest mountain if below-sea elevation is counted
Kohala	Big Island	120,000 BP (extinct)	20°05′10″N 155°43′02″W	~ 120,000–1 million	Oldest volcano that remains part of the island of Hawaiʻi
Māhukona	Seamount	470,000 BP (extinct)	20°01′N 156°01′W	K-Ar 298,000±25,000 and 310,000±31,000 (Note: The error estimate is given for two standard deviations (95% of data contained within this range). Each of the dates is an average of dates from each of two separate volcanic cones that are part of Māhukona.)	Submerged, having long since disappeared into the sea
Haleakalā	Maui	between A.D. 1480 and 1600, oldest currently active volcano in the Hawaiian - Emperor seamount chain	20°42′35″N 156°15′12″W	~ 2 million	Forms more than 75% of Maui
West Maui	Maui	less than 320,000 BP (extinct)	20°54′N 156°37′W	K-Ar 1.32±0.04 million	Very eroded shield volcano that makes up the western quarter of Maui
Kahoʻolawe	Kahoʻolawe	~1 MYA	20°33′N 156°36′W	K-Ar > 1.03±0.18 million	Smallest of the 8 principal Hawaiian islands; uninhabited
Lānaʻi	Lānaʻi	1.2 MYA	20°50′N 156°56′W	K-Ar date of 1.28±0.04 million	Sixth-largest island The only town is Lānaʻi City, a small settlement.
East Molokaʻi	Molokaʻi	1.3 MYA	21°7′N 156°51′W	K-Ar 1.76±0.04 million	The northern half of this volcano suffered a large collapse 1.5 million years ago. Only the southern half remains above the sea today.
West Molokaʻi	Molokaʻi	1.76 MYA	21°9′N 157°14′W	K-Ar date of 1.9±0.06 million	
Penguin Bank	Seamount	—	20°55′N 157°40′W	~ 2.2 million	The seamount is a submarine volcano, southwest of Molokaʻi. The submarine volcano used to be part of Maui Nui, a prehistoric island made from seven shield volcanoes.
Koʻolau Range	Oʻahu	<32,000 BP (possibly dormant) (Note: These volcanoes experienced a 'rejuvenation' phase significantly after their primary eruptions ended, for reasons unknown. Ko'olau originally erupted from 2.5-1.7 MYA, before entering into a dormancy period until roughly 500,000 years ago, and may possibly remain active. Kaua'i similarly erupted mainly 5 MYA, with a notably short period of secondary eruptions 1,430,000 to 1,410,000 years ago.)	21°19′N 157°46′W	2.7 million	A fragmented remnant of the eastern or windward shield volcano, which also suffered a large collapse sometime before the Molokaʻi collapse
Waiʻanae Range	Oʻahu	~2.5 MYA	21°30′N 158°09′W	~1.7–3.9 million; K-Ar 3.7±0.1 million	The eroded remains of a shield volcano that comprised the western half of the island
Kaʻena Ridge	Oʻahu	<3.0 MYA	21°42′N 158°22′W	~3.5–4.9 million	The eroded remains of a shield volcano west of Waiʻanae that has since subsided below sea level
Kaʻula	Kaʻula	>2 MYA	21°39′N 160°32′W	K-Ar 4.0±0.2 million	Tiny crescent-shaped barren island; uninhabited except for divers and fishermen
Niʻihau	Niʻihau	2 MYA	21°54′N 160°10′W	K-Ar 4.89±0.11 million	Smallest inhabited island;
Kauaʻi	Kauaʻi	1.41 MYA	22°05′N 159°30′W	K-Ar 5.1±0.2 million	Oldest and fourth largest of the main islands, and home to Mount Waialeale, one of the wettest areas on Earth in terms of precipitation

== Northwestern Hawaiian islands ==
Name	Type	Coordinates	Age	Notes
Unnamed seamount	Guyot	22°42′N 161°02′W	5.1 to 7.2 million (Note: The age of the volcano is unknown, but will be somewhere between the ages of the volcanoes on either side of it in the chain.)	at a depth of 40 m (130 ft) below sea level
Nīhoa	Extinct Island	23°03′N 161°55′W	K-Ar 7.2±0.3 million	Small rocky island which supported a small population around 1000 CE; features over 80 cultural sites, including religious places, agricultural terraces, and burial caves
Unnamed seamount	Guyot	22°59′N 162°14′W	7.2 to 10.3 million	at a depth of 10 m (33 ft) below sea level
Unnamed seamount	Guyot	23°14′N 162°37′W	7.2 to 10.3 million	at a depth of 229 m (751 ft) below sea level
Unnamed seamount	Guyot	23°14′N 162°57′W	7.2 to 10.3 million	at a depth of 5 m (16 ft) below sea level
Unnamed seamount	Guyot	23°12′N 163°10′W	7.2 to 10.3 million	at a depth of 44 m (144 ft) below sea level
Unnamed seamount	Guyot	23°18′N 163°16′W	7.2 to 10.3 million	at a depth of 413 m (1,355 ft) below sea level
Necker Island	Extinct Island	23°34′35″N 164°42′0″W	K-Ar 10.3±0.4 million	Small deserted island with Hawaiian religious shrines and artifacts
French Frigate Shoals	Atoll	23.8689°N 166.2860°W	12 million	Largest atoll in the northwestern Hawaiian islands
East Brooks Bank	Guyot	23°59′N 166°42′W	12 to 12.3 million	at a depth of 51 m (167 ft) below sea level
Central Brooks Bank	Guyot	24°07′N 166°49′W	12 to 12.3 million	at a depth of 29 m (95 ft) below sea level
West Brooks Bank	Guyot	24°12′N 166°57′W	12 to 12.3 million	at a depth of 24 m (79 ft) below sea level
Saint Rogatien Bank	Guyot	24°19′N 167°08′W	12 to 12.3 million	at a depth of 20 m (66 ft) below sea level
Gardner Pinnacles	Atoll Island	25°01′N 167°59′W	K-Ar 12.3±1.0 million	Two barren rock outcrops surrounded by a reef
Raita Bank	Guyot	25°33′N 169°27′W	12.3 to 19.9 million	at a depth of 13 m (43 ft) below sea level
Maro Reef	Atoll	25°25′N 170°35′W	12.3 to 19.9 million	Largest coral reef of the northwestern Hawaiian islands
Laysan	Atoll Island	25.7675°N 171.7334°W	K-Ar 19.9±0.3 million	Originally named "Kauō" meaning egg, referring to its shape, and home to one of only five natural lakes in all of Hawaiʻi
Unnamed seamount	Guyot	25°22′N 172°03′W	19.9 to 20.6 million	at a depth of 1 m (3.3 ft) below sea level
Northampton Seamount	Guyot	25°30′N 172°24′W	19.9 to 20.6 million	at a depth of 6 m (20 ft) below sea level
Unnamed seamount	Guyot	25°39′N 172°56′W	19.9 to 20.6 million	at a depth of 872 m (2,861 ft) below sea level
Pioneer Tablemount	Guyot	25°59′N 173°24′W	19.9 to 20.6 million	at a depth of 5 m (16 ft) below sea level
Lisianski Island	Atoll Island	26°3′49″N 173°57′57″W	19.9 to 20.6 million	A small island surrounded by a huge coral reef nearly the size of Oahu; named after a captain in the Russian navy whose ship ran aground there in 1805
Unnamed seamount	Guyot	26°18′N 174°32′W	19.9 to 20.6 million	at a depth of 67 m (220 ft) below sea level
Unnamed seamounts	Guyot	26°56′N 175°36′W	19.9 to 20.6 million	pair of guyots at a depth of 115 m (377 ft) and 1,207 m (3,960 ft) below sea level
Unnamed seamount	Guyot	27°09′N 176°10′W	19.9 to 20.6 million	at a depth of 1,233 m (4,045 ft) below sea level
Salmon Bank	Guyot	26°56′N 176°25′W	19.9 to 20.6 million	at a depth of 54 m (177 ft) below sea level
Pearl and Hermes Atoll	Atoll Island	27°48′N 175°51′W	K-Ar 20.6±2.7 million	A collection of small, sandy islands, with a lagoon and coral reef; named after two whaling ships which were wrecked on the reef in 1822
Unnamed seamount	Guyot	28°05′N 176°54′W	20.6 to 27.7 million	at a depth of 1,640 m (5,380 ft) below sea level
Ladd Seamount	Guyot	28°31′45″N 176°40′00″W	20.6 to 27.7 million	at a depth of 64 m (210 ft) below sea level
Midway Atoll	Atoll Island	28°12′N 177°21′W	K-Ar 27.7±0.6 million	Consists of a ring-shaped barrier reef and two large islets; named "Midway" because of its strategic location in the center of the Pacific Ocean, and was the site of a key battle during World War II
Nero Seamount	Guyot	27°57′55″N 177°57′50″W	27.7 to 38.7 million	at a depth of 67 m (220 ft) below sea level
Kure Atoll	Atoll	28°25′N 178°20′W	27.7 to 38.7 million	Northernmost coral atoll in the world

== Emperor seamounts ==
Name	Type	Summit Depth	Coordinates	Age	Notes
East Windward	Guyot	124 m (407 ft)	28°54′N 178°37′W	27.7 to 38.7 million	—
Academician Berg	Guyot	182 m (597 ft)	28°51′N 178°52′W	27.7 to 38.7 million	—
West Windward	Guyot	254 m (833 ft)	28°49′50″N 179°07′50″W	27.7 to 38.7 million	—
Helsley	Guyot	159 m (522 ft)	28°54′N 179°34′W	27.7 to 38.7 million	Named after Charles Helsley, a researcher at the University of Hawaii. Also named Zapadnaya Seamount.
East Townsend Cromwell	Seamount	506 m (1,660 ft)	29°41′N 179°20′E	27.7 to 38.7 million	—
Townsend Cromwell	Seamount	209 m (686 ft)	29°47′N 179°03′E	27.7 to 38.7 million	Named after Townsend Cromwell, a prominent oceanographer.
Hancock	Seamount	298 m (978 ft)	30°15′N 178°50′E	27.7 to 38.7 million	—
De Veuster	Seamount	474 m (1,555 ft)	30°22′30″N 177°34′00″E	27.7 to 38.7 million	possibly named after Father Damien (born Jozef De Veuster), a Roman Catholic Priest in Hawaii during the late 19th century.
Colahan	Seamount	232 m (761 ft)	31°15′N 176°0′E	K-Ar 38.7±0.2 million	—
Abbott	Seamount	1,680 m (5,510 ft)	31°48′N 174°18′E	K-Ar 41.5±0.3 million	—
Daikakuji	Guyot	1,050 m (3,440 ft)	32°05′N 172°18′E	K-Ar 42.4±2.3 and 46.7±0.1 million	Located at the bend in the L-shaped chain of seamounts. Also the name of a Japanese temple
Kammu	Guyot	319 m (1,047 ft)	32°10′N 173°00′E	42.4 to 43.4 million	Named after Emperor Kammu, former ruler of Japan (781–806)
Yuryaku	Guyot	492 m (1,614 ft)	32°40.2′N 172°16.2′E	K-Ar 43.4±1.6 million	Named after Emperor Yūryaku, former ruler of Japan (~456–479)
Goshirakawa	Guyot	3,203 m (10,509 ft)	32°39′N 171°34′E	~40 million	Named after Emperor Go-Shirakawa, former ruler of Japan (1155–1158)
Gosanjo	Guyot	2,620 m (8,600 ft)	32°54′N 171°34′E	~40 million	Named after Emperor Go-Sanjō, former ruler of Japan (1068–1073)
Toba	Guyot	963 m (3,159 ft)	33°14′N 171°39′E	~40 million	Named after Emperor Toba, former ruler of Japan (1107–1123)
Genji	Seamount	2,550 m (8,370 ft)	33°20′N 172°14′E	~40 million	Named after Hikaru Genji, the protagonist of the classic Japanese work, The Tale of Genji.
Kimmei	Seamount	222 m (728 ft)	33°41′N 171°38′E	K-Ar 39.9±1.2 and 47.9±0.2 million	Named after Emperor Kimmei, former ruler of Japan (539–571)
Unnamed Seamount	Seamount	82 m (269 ft)	34°57′00″N 171°35′40″E	same as Koko Guyot	
Koko	Guyot	247 m (810 ft)	35°15′N 171°35′E	K-Ar 48.1±0.8, 50.4±0.1 (south side), and 52.6±0.8 (north side) million	Named after Emperor Kōkō, former ruler of Japan (884–887)
Unnamed Guyot	Guyot	84 m (276 ft)	36°47′45″N 171°21′50″E	48.1 to 55.2 million	
Ojin	Guyot	197 m (646 ft)	37°58.2′N 170°22.8′E	K-Ar 55.2±0.7 million	Named after Emperor Ōjin, former ruler of Japan (~270–310)
Jingu	Guyot	588 m (1,929 ft)	38°50′N 171°15′E	K-Ar 55.4±0.9 million	Named after Empress Jingū, former ruler of Japan (~201–269)
Nintoku	Guyot	589 m (1,932 ft)	41°4.8′N 170°34.2′E	K-Ar 56.2±0.6 million	Named after Emperor Nintoku, former ruler of Japan (~313–399)
Ninigi	Seamount	1,549 m (5,082 ft)	41°44′N 170°12′E	56.2 to 59.6 million	Named after Ninigi-no-Mikoto, a god in Japanese mythology.
Godaigo	Seamount	1,560 m (5,120 ft)	41°51′N 170°33′E	56.2 to 59.6 million	Named after Emperor Go-Daigo, former ruler of Japan (1318–1339)
Yomei	Guyot	543 m (1,781 ft)	42°18′N 170°24′E	56.2 to 59.6 million	Named after Emperor Yōmei, former ruler of Japan (540–587)
Showa	Guyot	387 m (1,270 ft)	42°59′N 170°21′E	56.2 to 59.6 million	Named after Hirohito (Emperor Shōwa), former ruler of Japan (1926–1989)
Soga	Guyot	68 m (223 ft)	43°24′N 169°59′E	56.2 to 59.6 million	Named after Emperor Saga, former ruler of Japan (809–823)
Suiko	Seamount	995 m (3,264 ft)	44°35′N 170°20′E	K-Ar 59.6±0.6 (southern), 64.7±1.1 (central), and 60.9±0.3 million	Named after Empress Suiko, former ruler of Japan (592–628)
Winnebago	Guyot	1,680 m (5,510 ft)	48°10′N 168°20′E	60–81 million	
Tenji	Guyot	1,599 m (5,246 ft)	48°50′N 168°30′E	60–81 million	Named after Emperor Tenji, former ruler of Japan (661–672)
Detroit	Seamount	1,498 m (4,915 ft)	51°29′N 167°36′E	~ 81 million	Well-documented seamount, second-oldest. Rock from lava flows show that while Detroit Seamount was on the hotspot, activity coming from the volcano continued for the next 18 million years.
Meiji	Seamount	2,720 m (8,920 ft)	53°12′N 164°30′E	85 million	Named after Emperor Meiji, former ruler of Japan (1867–1912); oldest known seamount in the chain
