= Koko Guyot =

Guyot in the northern Pacific Ocean

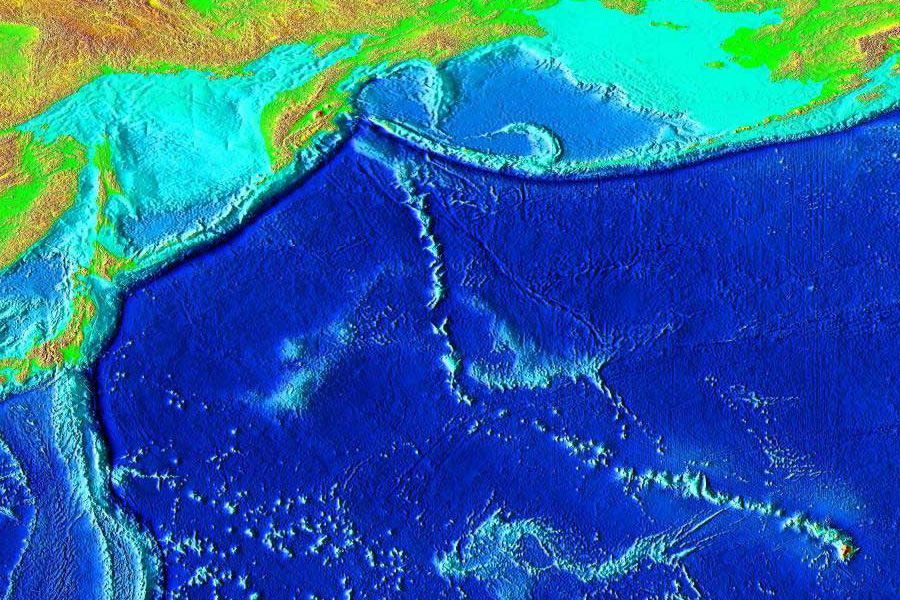
- Elevation of the Pacific seafloor, showing the Hawaiian-Emperor seamount chain, including Koko Guyot above the prominent bend. The sharp "V" separates the Hawaiian Ridge from the older Emperor Seamount portion of the chain. Koko is the largest of the seamounts directly north of the v-bend.
- Height: 5,000 m (16,000 ft)

Location
- Location: Central Pacific
- Group: Isolated
- Coordinates: 35°15′N 171°35′E

Geology
- Type: Guyot, Hotspot volcano
- Volcanic arc/chain: Hawaiian-Emperor seamount chain
- Age of rock: 48.1 million
- Last eruption: 40 million years ago

History
- First visit: 1973, ODP Site 308

Koko Guyot is a 48.1-million-year-old guyot, a type of underwater volcano with a flat top, which lies near the southern end of the Emperor seamounts, about 200 km (124 mi) north of the "bend" in the volcanic Hawaiian-Emperor seamount chain. Pillow lava has been sampled on the north west flank of Koko Seamount, and the oldest dated lava is 40 million years old. Seismic studies indicate that it is built on a 9 km (6 mi) thick portion of the Pacific Plate. The oldest rock from the north side of Koko Seamount is dated at 52.6 and the south side of Koko at 50.4 million years ago. To the southeast of the bend is Kimmei Seamount at 47.9 million years ago and southeast of it, Daikakuji at 46.7.

== Geology and characteristics ==
The seamount was named for the 58th emperor of Japan, Emperor Koko (A.D. 885–887) by geologist Thomas Davies and his colleagues in 1972, based on the results from a bathymetric expedition and contents of two dredge hauls, led by Thomas Washington and undertaken with the ship Aries-7. The seamount is elongate in shape, aligned northwest–southeast (the same direction as the chain), and has a gentle slope and a large, flat top. Koko Seamount also has a lot of small reefal bodies on its slopes. It rises from the abyssal floor about 5,000 m (16,000 ft) in height.

A prominent south-trending ridge extends about 50 km (31 mi) from the summit area in the direction of Kimmei Seamount, to the southeast. The base of the guyot is similar to a "pedestal," and is composed of consolidated lavas and extinct volcanic centers of the volcano's formally active history; it is similar to structure to the pedestal found at the base of most of the other, usually larger Emperor seamounts. However, a thick carbonate cap, similar to the one covering Detroit Seamount, makes it difficult to find the exact eruptive centers. The volcano is clearly isolated, even in comparison to other seamounts in the spread-out Emperor chain, with Ojin Seamount about 200 km (124 mi) to the northwest and Kimmei Seamount 100 km (62 mi) to the southeast. The seamount is located just 2.3 degrees north of the bend.

Much of what is known about Koko comes from early dredgings and the Ocean Drilling Program's core samples, collected as part of Leg 197, at Site 1206, which aimed to supply information on the relatively obscure Emperor seamounts and study their relation to the Hawaiian chain. Site 1206 was the last and southernmost drilling site during Leg 197, and was located on the southeastern side of the lower summit terrace of Koko Seamount. A seismic survey of the region was utilized to locate a suitable place for the drill site, initially targeted near Site 308, drilled in 1973 during Leg 32. Weather conditions during the drilling had prevented it from reaching 68.5 m (225 ft) in depth, the approximate depth of the sediment cover in the region. Due to a shortage of time, priority was placed on finding a region with a thin sedimentary cover. The site eventually chosen was located at a water depth of 1,545 m (5,069 ft), 6.2 km (4 mi) south of Site 308, at coordinates 34°55.55′N 172°8.75′E. The sediment cover at this site was less than half that at the 1973 drill site, and rock was hit at a subsurface depth of 57 m (187 ft). Drilling continued to 278 m (912 ft) into the slopes.

The top 57 m (187 ft) of sediment included fossil-rich calcarenite and calcium-rich mudstone and siltstone, indicating a shallow-water setting at the time of deposition. The lower part of the core sample recovered a 15 cm (6 in) to 20 cm (8 in) section of shell-bearing mudstone containing many microfossils typical of the early to middle Eocene (43.5-49.7 Ma). This age range fits well with a radiometric analysis (48.1 Ma) reported for a dredged rock from Koko Seamount from the 1973 expedition. Although shell fragments had been recovered from the sediment cover in 1973, none of these deposits contained microfossils.

Lava flows dominate the lithology of the main body, with a small proportion of calcarenite. Many lavas were pahoehoe flows laced with a'a, evidence of subaerial eruptions. There was a large amount of variation in the density, structure, porosity, and grain size of the recovered volcanic rock, varying widely with depth. The bulk of the volcanic rock is basalt of aphyric to olivine-phyric lava, and tholeiitic or alkalic in composition. The basaltic lavas from Koko Seamount resemble those drilled during Leg 55, at Suiko Seamount.

Studies suggested that the magnetic arrangement of the rock, used to determine its latitude at formation (magnets align to the North Pole; also, the drift and position of the Hawaii hotspot at various times is important to hotspot studies), were relatively stable. 14 magnetic groupings were found on the seamount, yielding a mean latitude of 38.5 degrees south of the seamount's present location (the percent of error is +8.4°/-10.9°). That would put the seamount at 21.7° N in latitude during its early history, before the Pacific Plate moved it to its current position relative to Earth.

== Ancient ecology ==
Dredged carbonate samples from the top of the seamount contained porites and several other corals, covered by coralline algae at shallow to medium depth. Also present were Amphistegina, red algae (mainly Lithothamnion and Sporolithon), lepidocyclines, bryozoans, and coralline at deeper depths. The recorded lepidocyclinids indicate an Early Miocene age for the drowned carbonate platforms found on the seamount, at about 500 m (1,640 ft).

== See also ==
- Hawaii hotspot
- Hawaiian-Emperor seamount chain

== See also ==
- List of volcanoes in the Hawaiian – Emperor seamount chain
