= Nintoku Seamount =

Flat topped seamount in the Hawaiian-Emperor seamount chain

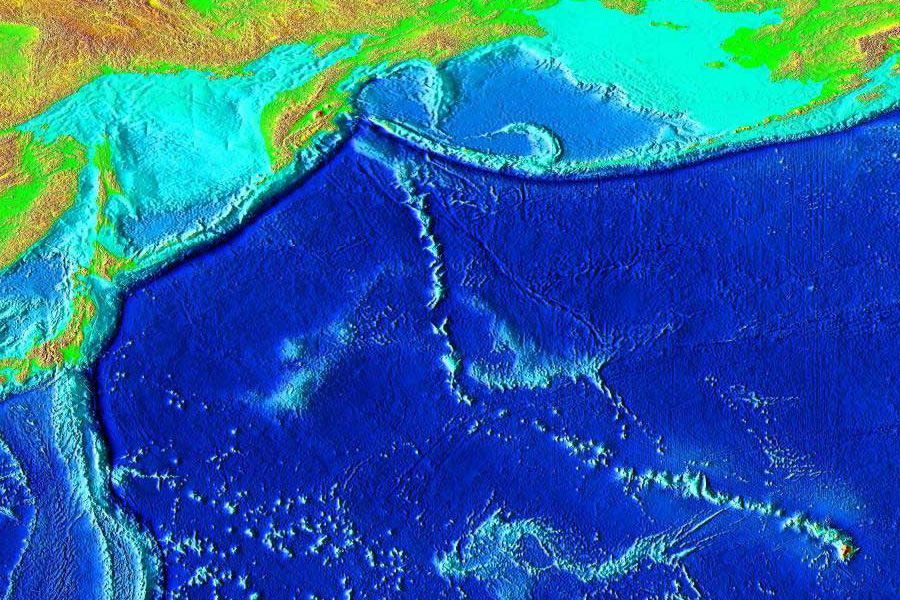
- Elevation of the Pacific seafloor, showing the Hawaiian-Emperor seamount chain, including Nintoku Seamount near the center of the "V". The sharp "V" separates the Hawaiian Ridge from the older Emperor Seamount portion of the chain.
- Height: over 1,600 m (5,249 ft)
- Summit area: 3400 square kilometers

Location
- Location: Middle of the chain
- Group: Emperor seamounts
- Coordinates: 41°4.80′N 170°34.20′E

Geology
- Type: Guyot, Hotspot volcano
- Volcanic arc/chain: Hawaiian-Emperor seamount chain
- Age of rock: 56.2 million years old.

Nintoku Seamount or Nintoku Guyot is a seamount (underwater volcano) and guyot (flat top) in the Hawaiian-Emperor seamount chain. It is a large, irregularly shaped volcano that last erupted 66 million years ago. Three lava flows have been sampled at Nintoku Seamount; the flows are almost all alkalic (subaerial) lava. It is 56.2 million years old.

Nintoku is positioned a roughly 41 degrees north latitude, approximately two-thirds the way southward along the north-northeast-south-southeast Emperor seamounts extending from Meiji Seamount (about 53°N) in the north to Kammu Seamount (about 32°N) at the chain's southern terminus. Nintoku Seamount was named after the 16th emperor of Japan, Emperor Nintoku, by geologist Robert Dietz in 1954.

The seamount occupies a central position in the Emperor Seamount chain and is thus an important point in the paleolatitude history of the Hawaiian hotspot, instrumental to proving the scientific hunch that the Hawaii hotspot was a mobile entity. The structure of the seamount is elongate, aligned north-northwest along the Emperor trend, with two prominent ridges trending southwest and south-southwest as far as 100 km (62 mi) from the main crater. Nintoku Seamount is a plexus of coalesced volcanoes, much like many of the larger seamounts in this chain. The Nintoku system is, however, clearly isolated from Yomei Seamount, about 100 km (62 mi) to the north, and Jingu Seamount, about 200 km (124 mi) to south, by abyssal depths.

== Geology and characteristics ==
In seismic profile, the main body of the seamount rises steeply over 5,000 m (16,404 ft) in predominantly unsedimented volcanic slope to the thinly sedimented (10 m (33 ft) to 200 m (660 ft)), from an Emperor point of view, gently domed summit region between 1,200 m (3,937 ft) to 1,400 m (4,593 ft) high peak profile, which covers about 3400 square kilometers of area.

From analysis of seismic reflection survey data and core material recovered by drillings at Site 432, the shipboard party of Deep Sea Drilling Project (DSDP) Leg 55 proposed that Nintoku Seamount was in an intermediate atoll stage (no lagoon but fringing reefs and banks and extensive carbonate bank interiors) before subsidence removed the island below the wave base. It was further thought that a few small remnant volcanic peaks and domes still pierce the sedimentary deposits.

Nintoku Seamount apparently remained at or above sea level long enough to be almost completely devastated by subaerial erosion and wave action. Reefs were not indicated in the seismic studies, but fragmented pieces of coral were recovered and documented, showing a shallow-water sediment-rich condition. The rock records indicate deposition in waters cooler than the present tropical condition. Shallow-water sedimentary deposition ceased in Paleogene times.

The seamount was first drilled by Site 432, located on the northwestern edge of the summit region of Nintoku Seamount, in a gently sloping area mapped as terrace deposits. Although the sediment cover was estimated, based on other seamount covers, to be 80 m (262 ft) thick, bedrock was hit after only 42 m (138 ft). Poorly recovered and preserved sedimentary deposits indicated a shallow-reef bed typical of terraced flanking reefs and banks, as well as volcanic sand. Drilling at Site 432 penetrated 32 m (105 ft) of volcanic rock (74 m (243 ft) total) before terminating because of hole caving and damage to the drill assembly.

The site was drilled as part of Leg 197 by the Ocean Drilling Program, at site number 1205. A short bathymetric acoustic survey was conducted to find the best site for the location and structure of a core sampling. The locale chosen was about 100 m (328 ft) southwest of Site 432, the location of a previous drilling by the ODP.

Site 1205 (41°20.00′N 170°22.70′E) was located in 1,310-metre-deep (4,298 ft) water, where previous drilling had reached volcanic rock beneath Paleocene deposits. It was elected to return to the site for a number of reasons. First, drilling at the nearby site 432 had hit reasonably unaltered and unchanged basalt with good remnant magnetic properties, key to finding the latitude of origin; but insufficient sampling caused a lack of data, and determining the age accurately was not possible. Hence, deeper drilling was promised to achieve that goal, providing a time-averaged (as the seamount is in the center of the chain) movement ratio. Second, a survey of the region showed a rock structure suitable for deep drilling, and nearby sites met low levels of sedimentary cover. Thirdly, the composition of previously drilled volcanic rock seemed to match the volcano's "average" type, erupted during the post-shield stage of it life. This helped another project goal, to recover a suitable and datable chunk of tholeiitic lava, which appeared to be rare on the seamount.

The hole was drilled in what appeared to be a large, broad sedimentary cover (estimated 70 m (230 ft) in thickness) covering a swath of the ancient volcano's main slope. The coring encountered volcanic rock at 42 m (138 ft) below the sea floor, and continued to a final depth of 326 m (1,070 ft) below the sea floor. The sedimentary cover, an element commonly found on many of the Emperor seamounts, was found to be largely a stack interlaced lava flows (about 95%). The drilling penetrated 283 m (928 ft) into the seamount's volcanic rock, and recovered at least 25 different hardened lava flows.

It was established that Nintoku Seamount's sedimentary cap consists of sandstone and siltstone containing well-rounded to subrounded basalt blocks, volcanic ash, fossil fragments of mollusks, benthic foraminifers, bryozoans, and coralline red algae. These observations indicate a shallow-water, high-rate depositional setting. Little variation was found in the density, grain size, or porosity of the volcanic rock, and it was stable in composition, except for the volcanic-sedimentary cover. It is believed that this is the underlying cause of aucousically recorded layering of the upper 200 m (656 ft)-230 m (755 ft) of rock, after which the effect of soil layering fades away.

The age of the youngest volcanic rocks was constrained by nano-fossils in the sediment to be older than 53.6–54.7 million years, an age that is just younger than the radiometric age of 56.2 ± 0.6 million obtained for the basalt drilled from nearby Hole 432A. The thickness and vesicularity of the lava flows, as well as the presence of oxidized flow tops and soil horizons and a lack of pillow lava, indicate that all of the obtained samples erupted subaerially. The volcanic rock ranges from aphyric to highly plagioclase and olivine-phyric basalt. At 230 to 255 meters below ground, two flows of tholeiitic basalt were found interlaced with the alkalic basalt flows. Above these flows the degree of alkalinity skyrockets. There is evidence suggesting that the eruption rates must have been lower at the period during which the two flows were deposited, which is consistent with the model of Hawaiian volcanic growth, which increases in activity slowly over time before ceasing altogether. Internal lava flows have also created course-grained rocks. Lavas from Nintoku Seamount have similar composition to lava erupted during the post-shield stage of Hawaiian volcanoes such as Mauna Kea. Slight differences in trace element composition between lavas from Nintoku Seamount and active Hawaiian volcanoes probably result from differences in source composition or variations in the degree of melting.

All of the recovered lava flows had been altered very little by erosion or other lava flows, except for thin flow tops. Sparse veining indicates that there is only small-scale fluid circulation within the rocks, in contrast with some of the data collected from Detroit Seamount.

Rock magnetic data obtained suggest that the lava flows from Site 1205 carry a remnant magnetization suitable for scientific analysis. Although some of the rocks needed a more complex and thorough analysis, most samples yielded data suitable to make a preliminary determination of magnetic inclinations. Twenty-two independent magnetic group were identified, yielding a mean inclination of -45.7° (+10.5°/-6.3°). The mean inclination suggests a latitude of formation on an early Eocene Nintoku Seamount at 27.1° (+5.5°/-7.7°). This value, together with paleo-latitudes from analyses of rocks at Site 433 (1980), Site 884 (1997), and Sites 1203 and 1204 (Leg 197; Detroit Seamount), form a consistent data set indicating southward motion of the Hawaiian hotspot from Late Cretaceous to early Tertiary time, a hunch that many scientists had harbored for a long time.

== See also ==
- List of volcanoes in the Hawaiian – Emperor seamount chain
