= Yuryaku Seamount =

Flat topped seamount of the Hawaiian-Emperor seamount chain in the northern Pacific Ocean

Yuryaku Guyot
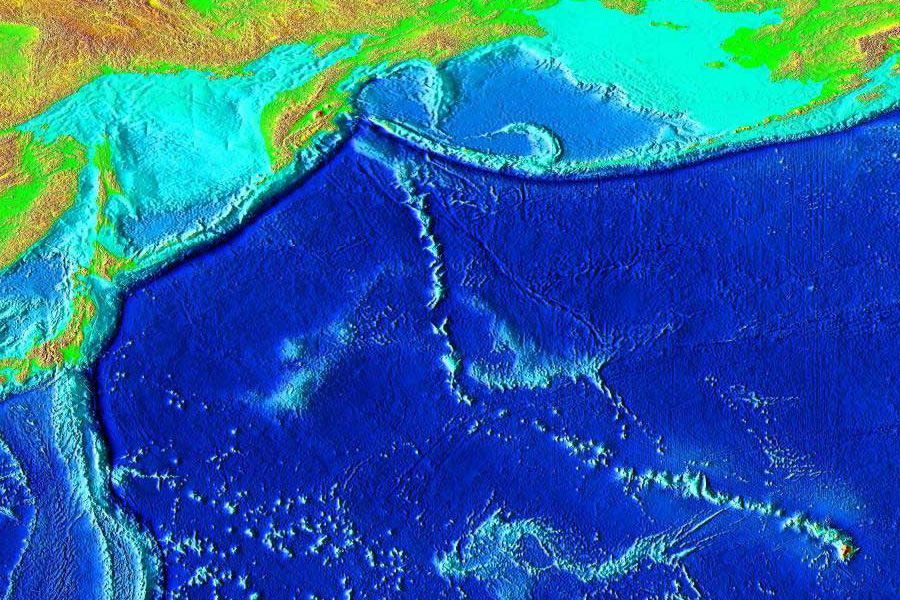
- Elevation of the Pacific seafloor, showing the Hawaiian-Emperor seamount chain, including Yuryaku Seamount a bit off of the V. The sharp "V" separates the Hawaiian Ridge from the older Emperor Seamount portion of the chain. Yuryaku is the center/northernmost and most elongated of the small grouping of three fairly small volcanoes near the bend.

Location
- Group: Emperor seamounts
- Coordinates: 32°40.20′N 172°16.2′E

Geology
- Type: Guyot, Hotspot volcano
- Volcanic arc/chain: Hawaiian-Emperor seamount chain
- Last eruption: 43 million years ago

Yuryaku Seamount (also called Yuryaku Guyot) is a seamount (underwater volcano) and guyot (flat-topped) located northwest of Hawaii. It is located a little southwest of the V-shaped bend separating the Emperor Seamounts from the older Hawaiian islands, all of the Hawaiian-Emperor seamount chain in the North Pacific Ocean.

== Geology ==
Alkalic basalt dredged from Yuryaku Seamount is similar to the alkalic basalt that caps the volcanoes in the Hawaiian Islands. Analyses gave a mean age of 42.3 ± 1.6 m.y. for Yuryaku Seamount. The data collected helped show that the age of the Hawaiian-Emperor bend is about 41 to 43 m.y. Alkalic basalt have been sampled at Yuryaku Seamount.

The last eruptions of Yuryaku Seamount were 43 million years ago, during the Eocene epoch of the Paleogene Period.

== See also ==
- List of volcanoes in the Hawaiian – Emperor seamount chain
