= Daikakuji Guyot =

Seamount in the Hawaiian Emperor chain bend area

Daikakuji Seamount
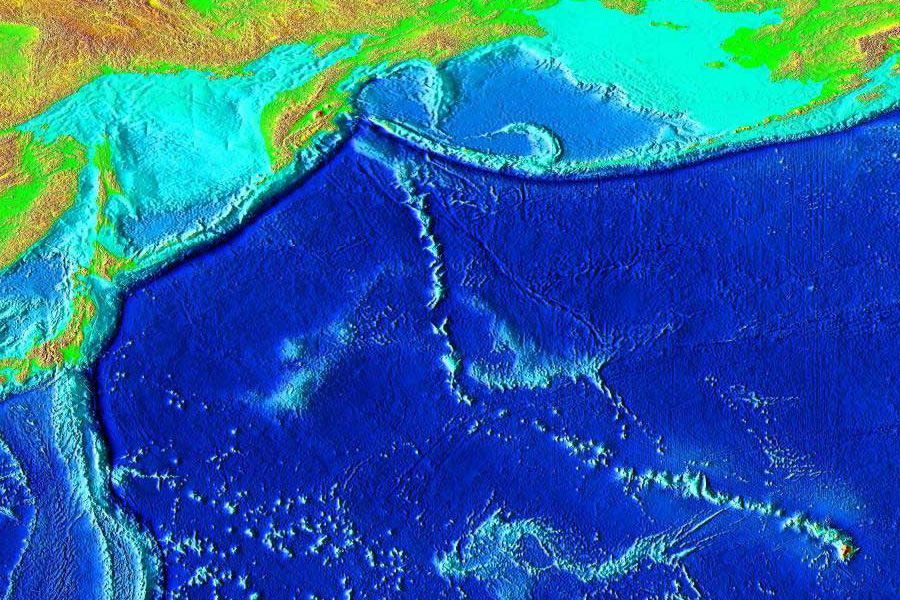
- Elevation of the Pacific seafloor, showing the Hawaiian-Emperor seamount chain, including Daikakuji Seamount near the prominent V-shaped bend, which separates the Hawaiian Ridge from the older Emperor Seamount portion of the chain. Daikakuji is the southeastern of the two moderately-sized seamounts just after the bottom of the V-bend, and the most recent of the large volcanoes for a long time.
- Elevation of the Pacific seafloor, showing the Hawaiian-Emperor seamount chain, including Daikakuji Seamount near the prominent V-shaped bend, which separates the Hawaiian Ridge from the older Emperor Seamount portion of the chain. Daikakuji is the southeastern of the two moderately-sized seamounts just after the bottom of the V-bend, and the most recent of the large volcanoes for a long time.
- Summit depth: 1,000 m (3,281 ft)
- Height: 4,000 m (157,480 in)
- Summit area: 30 km (19 mi) diameter

Location
- Location: Central Pacific Ocean
- Group: Emperor seamounts
- Coordinates: 32°5.00′N 172°18′E

Geology
- Type: Guyot
- Volcanic arc/chain: Hawaiian-Emperor seamount chain
- Age of rock: 47 million years

History
- First visit: GLORIA program, USGS

Daikakuji Seamount is a seamount (underwater volcano) and the southwesternmost volcanic feature in the Hawaiian Emperor chain bend area.

== Geology ==
The seamount is very close to the V-shaped bend in the Hawaiian-Emperor seamount chain, and thus would be useful in understanding the exact age of the bend. Although few dredge samples are available, they have all been reliably dated at 47 million years (Sharp and Clague, Science, 313, 1281–84, 2006), during the Eocene epoch of the Paleogene period.

During the cruise SO112 of the R/V SONNE, high resolution bathymetric mapping was conducted, showing that Daikakuji is nearly 30 km (19 mi) in diameter and nearly 4,000 m (13,123 ft) in height, with a summit lying 1,000 m (3,281 ft) underwater.

Because of its flat capped top, Daikakuji is considered a guyot. A smaller, younger, secondary guyot just east of the main mass overlaps its slope. The western site suffered a large collapse sometime in its history, evident by a large slump, that likely carried away a significant part of the volcano's caldera.

Daikakuji Seamount has some well developed rift zones oriented towards the Emperor portion of the chain, whereas the younger, secondary cone has rift flanks in the direction of the Hawaiian ridge.

== See also ==
- List of volcanoes in the Hawaiian – Emperor seamount chain
