= Jingū Seamount =

Guyot of the Hawaiian-Emperor seamount chain in the Pacific Ocean

Coordinates: 38°45′N 171°15′E

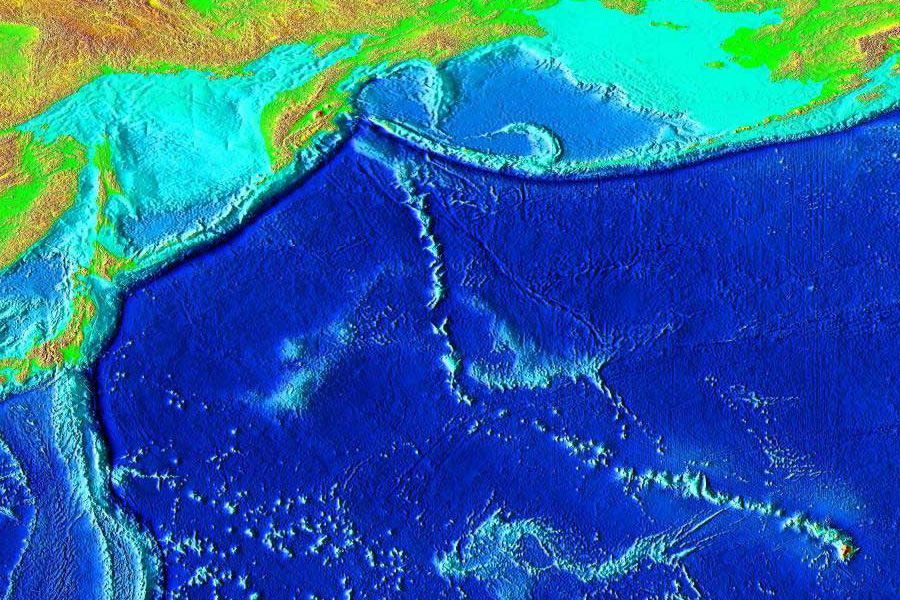
The Hawaiian-Emperor seamount chain on an Elevation World Map.

Jingū Seamount, also called Jingū Guyot, is a guyot of the Hawaiian-Emperor seamount chain in the Pacific Ocean. It erupted 55 million years ago. The seamount is elongated in structure, running north–south, and has an oval shaped crater in the center, which is evidence of collapse when above sea level.

The seamount was named in 1954 by Robert S. Dietz, after Japanese Empress Jingū.

== See also ==
- List of volcanoes in the Hawaiian – Emperor seamount chain
