= 1955 Hawaiian submarine eruption =

Submarine eruption northeast of Necker Island, Hawaii, United States

Coordinates: 23°35′N 163°50′W

The 1955 Hawaiian submarine eruption was a submarine eruption that occurred 90 km (56 mi) northeast of Necker Island on August 20, 1955. Steaming water, water discoloration and an eruption column took place during the eruption. A possible pumice raft was also witnessed. The eruption originated about 4 km (2.5 mi) below sea level from an unnamed submarine volcano. The eruption produced a column of smoke several meters high. It is probably the westernmost historical eruption within the Hawaiian Islands. Another but less certain submarine eruption may have occurred on May 22, 1956 at the Kaʻena Ridge, 60 km (37 mi) northwest of Oʻahu in the Kaʻieʻie Waho Channel between that island and Kauaʻi.
