= Christmas Island Seamount Province =

Group of seamounts in the Indian Ocean

Coordinates: 13°S 106°E

- Location within Indian Ocean
- Height: up to 4,500 m (14,800 ft)

Location
- Location: Indian Ocean

Geology
- Type: Seamount grouping
- Volcanic arc/chain: Hotspot volcanoes
- Age of rock: 47 to 136 million years old

The Christmas Island Seamount Province (also known as the Christmas Island Seamounts) is an unusual seamount (submarine volcano) formation named for Christmas Island, an Australian territory and wildlife reserve that is also part of the chain. The province consists of more than 50 seamounts, up to 4,500 m (14,800 ft) in height, within a 1,080,000 km^{2} (417,000 sq mi) area.

Unlike most seamount groups, the Christmas Island seamount formation does not form a long hotspot-based chain of increasingly older volcanoes, instead being a scattered grouping of volcanoes within a large radius. The origins of the formation have long been enigmatic for scientists; the Christmas Island area does not exhibit the hotspot chain formation that most seamount groups have, nor does it run perpendicular to a local rift zone, instead lying roughly parallel to the edge of the Australian Plate. Many of the seamounts are flat-topped guyots, showing that at one point the province was likely a group of active volcanic islands, before it was slowly eroded to its current subsurface level.

A 2011 study acquired and tested rock samples for ^{40}Ar/^{39}Ar, strontium, neodymium, hafnium and lead to determine its age and origin. The study found that the rock of the seamounts was more similar to continental than oceanic crust, particularly resembling northwest Australian crust. The seamounts were found to be 47 to 136 million years old, decreasing in age from east to west, and at most 25 million years younger than the crust surrounding them. Plate reconstructions based on these dates showed that the seamounts formed where West Burma separated from Australia and India, during the breakup of Gondwana, approximately 150 million years ago. The paper proposed that the seamounts are made of recycled, delaminated continental crust enriched in mantle material that was rising beneath the mid-ocean ridge forming at the time, and that this may be a relatively common process in shallow-basin areas.
