= Abbott Seamount =

Seamount lying within the Hawaiian-Emperor seamount chain in the northern Pacific Ocean

Location
- Coordinates: 31°48′N 174°18′E

Geology
- Last eruption: 36-40 million years ago

Abbott Seamount is a seamount lying within the Hawaiian-Emperor seamount chain in the northern Pacific Ocean. It erupted 36-40 million years ago.

Position is 31° 48' 00" N, 174° 18' 00" E

== See also ==
- List of volcanoes in the Hawaiian – Emperor seamount chain
