= Colahan Seamount =

Seamount in the Hawaiian–Emperor seamount chain in the northern Pacific

Colahan Seamount is a seamount lying within the Hawaiian–Emperor seamount chain in the northern Pacific Ocean. It erupted 37–40 million years ago.

== See also ==
- List of volcanoes in the Hawaiian – Emperor seamount chain
