= Detroit Seamount =

One of the oldest seamounts of the Hawaiian-Emperor seamount chain

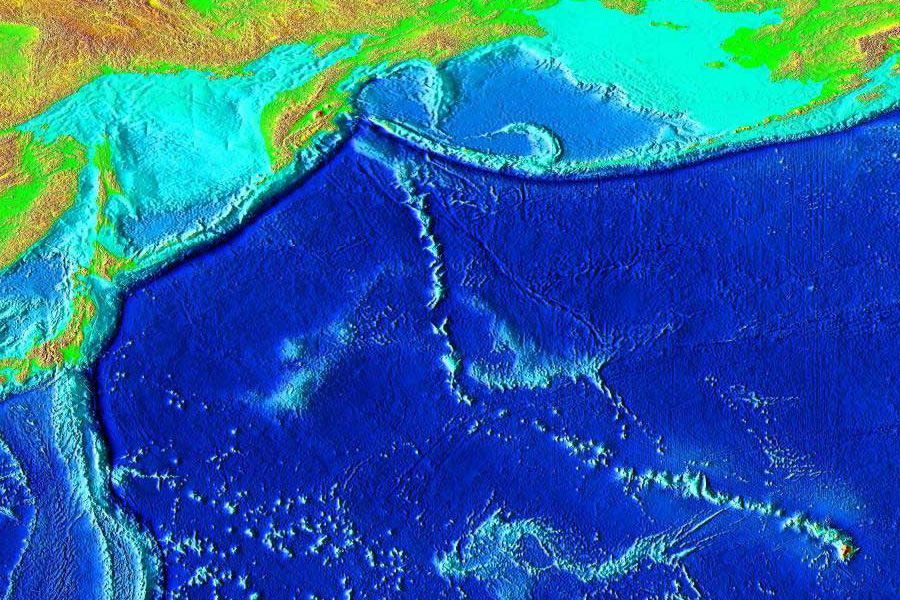
- Elevation of the Pacific seafloor, showing the Hawaiian-Emperor seamount chain, including Detroit Seamount near the top. The sharp "V" separates the Hawaiian Ridge from the older Emperor Seamount portion of the chain.
- Summit depth: 1,550 m (5,085 ft)

Location
- Location: Northwest Pacific Ocean, towards Russia
- Group: Emperor seamounts
- Coordinates: 51°28.80′N 167°36′E

Geology
- Type: Guyot
- Volcanic arc/chain: Hawaiian-Emperor seamount chain
- Age of rock: 81 and 76 million years Built ~81 million; near surface about 78 million years ago, then subsided; renewed phase of volcanism around 60 million years ago

History
- First visit: GLORIA program, USGS

Detroit Seamount, which was formed around 76 million years ago, is one of the oldest seamounts of the Hawaiian-Emperor seamount chain (Meiji Seamount is the oldest, at 82 million years). It lies near the northernmost end of the chain and is south of Aleutian Islands (near Russia), at 51°28.80′N 167°36′E.

Detroit Seamount is one of the few seamounts to break the naming scheme of the Emperor seamounts, which are named mostly after emperors or empresses of the Kofun period of Japanese history. It is instead named after the light cruiser USS Detroit.

The Detroit Seamount is as big as the island of Hawaii.

== Mapping ==
The seamount was initially mapped by the GLORIA program of the USGS, and in far more detail in 2001 by leg 197 of the Ocean Drilling Program (ODP). 2001 marked a two-month excursion aboard the research vessel JOIDES Resolution to collect samples of lava flows from four submerged volcanoes, among them Detroit Seamount, which was drilled twice. The expedition was funded by the Ocean Drilling Program, an international research effort designed to study the world's seafloors, and the drill sites were numbers 1203 through 1206. The project drilled Detroit, Nintoku, and Koko seamounts, all in the far northwest of the chain. Detroit Seamount was drilled twice (numbered 1203 and 1204), on the summit and on one of its secondary cones; care was taken to put the locations away from major fault lines or other geological features that would otherwise invalidate or bias the results.

In 2005 it underwent a detailed geological analysis by scientists from Stanford University.

== Geology ==
After its initial formation 81 million years ago, the volcano was active for 25 million years. Parts of the volcano appear to be older than the oldest volcano in the chain, Meiji Seamount. The 2005 analysis found that the volcano had been active throughout much of the Eocene (circa 52–34 million years ago), and that activity may have extended into the Oligocene (under 34 million years ago). The large difference between the youngest and oldest lavas provides evidence that the Hawaii hotspot migrated far more slowly than it does today; for example, Kohala volcano (the oldest volcano of Hawaii island) first emerged from the sea 500,000 years ago, and last erupted 120,000 years ago, a period of only 380,000 years in comparison to Detroit's 18 million or more years of volcanic activity. The large age difference (51 vs. 34 million years) between the submarine preshield stages and the post-shield rejuvenated stage seems to indicate that volcanoes in the chain can erupt again long after they are believed to be extinct. The volcano is known to have erupted intermediately in an underwater and shallow-water environment.

Detroit Seamount has a wide (100,000 square kilometres [39,000 sq mi]) base and rises from the bottom of the abyssal plain to a depth of approximately 1,550 m (5,085 ft); in fact, it is as wide as Hawaii island at the head of the chain. The width of the seamount, as well as the extremely gentle slope, which is very shallow even for a Hawaiian shield volcano, seem to show that the seamount suffered a catastrophic collapse sometime in its history; such a collapse is a relatively common event in the growth of Hawaiian volcanoes, caused when the volcanoes grow so fast that they destabilize. A sequence of sediments 800 m (2,600 ft) to 900 m (3,000 ft) thick compose the volcano, in several layers. Some papers refer to only the shallowest part of the volcano as Detroit Seamount, and the rest of the seamount as the "Detroit Rise". The tallest volcanic cones of the seamount peak 1 km (0.62 mi) to 2 km (1.2 mi) above the rest of the seamount.

== Mantle of sediment ==
The seamount was thought to be covered in a cap of sediment, which was confirmed in 2005. All but the topmost cones of Detroit Seamount are capped in a thick layer of sediments, which were found to have drifted there from a direction due northwest. The drift that carried the sediments onto the volcano was named the "Meiji Drift", after the oldest volcano in the chain, Meiji Seamount, which was also in that direction. The drift is of Oligocene to Quaternary-era mud, deposited by ocean currents. The tallest parts of the seamount protrude above this "mud cap", which at its deepest is estimated to be 840 m (2,756 ft) thick. They formed 34 million years ago.

A 2005 analysis of the results of the 2001 JOIDES Resolution excursion found the age, composition, structure, and history of growth for the seamount. The evaluation also focused on the strange cones that poked through the sedimentary layers. They were deposited onto the seamount before the Meiji Drift developed. Analysis put the latest date of their formation at 60 million years ago, 6 million years into the seamount's life.
