= Meiji Seamount =

Oldest seamount in the Hawaiian-Emperor seamount chain

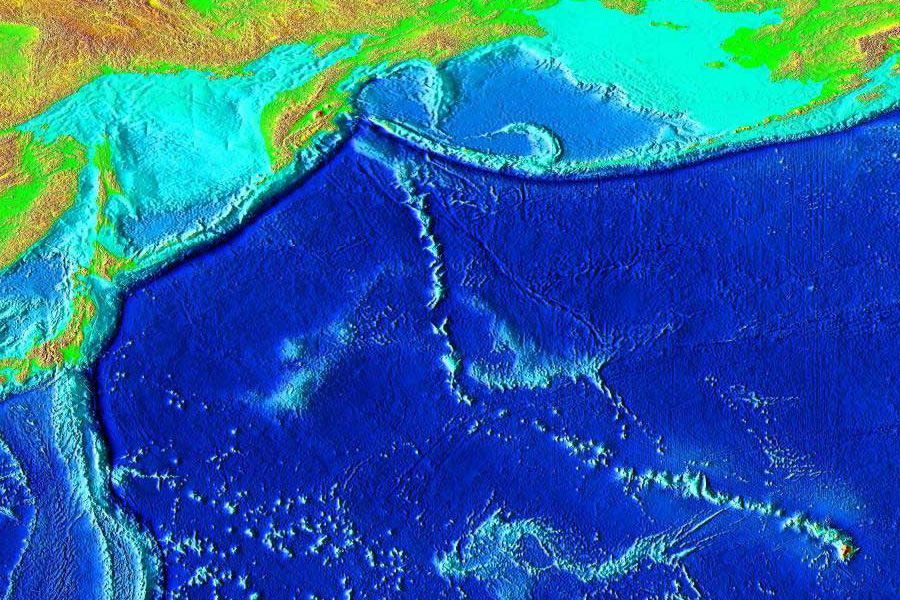
- Elevation of the Pacific seafloor, showing the Hawaiian-Emperor seamount chain including Meiji Seamount near top.
- Elevation of the Pacific seafloor, showing the Hawaiian-Emperor seamount chain including Meiji Seamount near top.
- Summit depth: approx. 2,000 m (6,562 ft)

Location
- Location: North Pacific Ocean, east of the Kamchatka Peninsula
- Coordinates: 53°12′N 164°30′E

Geology
- Type: Guyot
- Volcanic arc/chain: Hawaiian-Emperor seamount chain
- Age of rock: 82 million years

Meiji Seamount, named after Emperor Meiji, the 122nd Emperor of Japan, is the oldest seamount in the Hawaiian-Emperor seamount chain, with an estimated age of 82 million years. It lies at the northernmost end of the chain, lies off the coast of the Kamchatka Peninsula, and is perched at the outer slope of the Kuril–Kamchatka Trench. Like the rest of the Emperor seamounts, it was formed by the Hawaii hotspot volcanism, grew to become an island, and has since subsided to below sea level, all while being carried first north and now northwest by the motion of the Pacific Plate. Meiji Seamount is thus an example of a particular type of seamount known as a guyot, and some publications refer to it as Meiji Guyot.

Meiji Seamount will eventually be destroyed by subduction into the Kuril–Kamchatka Trench where it is carried by the ongoing plate motion, although this will not fully occur for several million more years if the current rate of motion is maintained. Although Meiji is the oldest extant seamount in the Hawaii-Emperor chain, the question of whether there were older seamounts in the chain which have already been subducted into the trench remains open, and is the subject of ongoing scientific research.

The Deep Sea Drilling Project (DSDP) Leg 19, Hole 192A, recovered 13 m (43 ft) of pillow lava from near the summit of Meiji. The lavas were initially classified as alkali basalts on the basis of their mineralogy, but subsequent microprobe analyses of glass and pyroxene suggested that they are tholeiitic in origin. At least five flows were found.

== See also ==
- Hawaiian-Emperor seamount chain
- Evolution of Hawaiian volcanoes
- Hotspot (geology)
- Detroit Seamount
