= Hancock Seamount =

Seamount of the Hawaiian-Emperor seamount chain in the Pacific Ocean

Hancock Seamount is a seamount of the Hawaiian-Emperor seamount chain in the Pacific Ocean.

It was formed in the Eocene and Oligocene epochs of the Paleogene Period. The last eruption from Hancock Seamount is unknown.

To the southwest is Kure Atoll, which is the northernmost living atoll and westernmost island of the Hawaiian–Emperor seamount chain.

== See also ==
- List of volcanoes in the Hawaiian – Emperor seamount chain
