= Kammu Seamount =

Seamount in the Hawaiian-Emperor seamount chain in the Pacific Ocean

Coordinates: 32°00′N 173°10′E

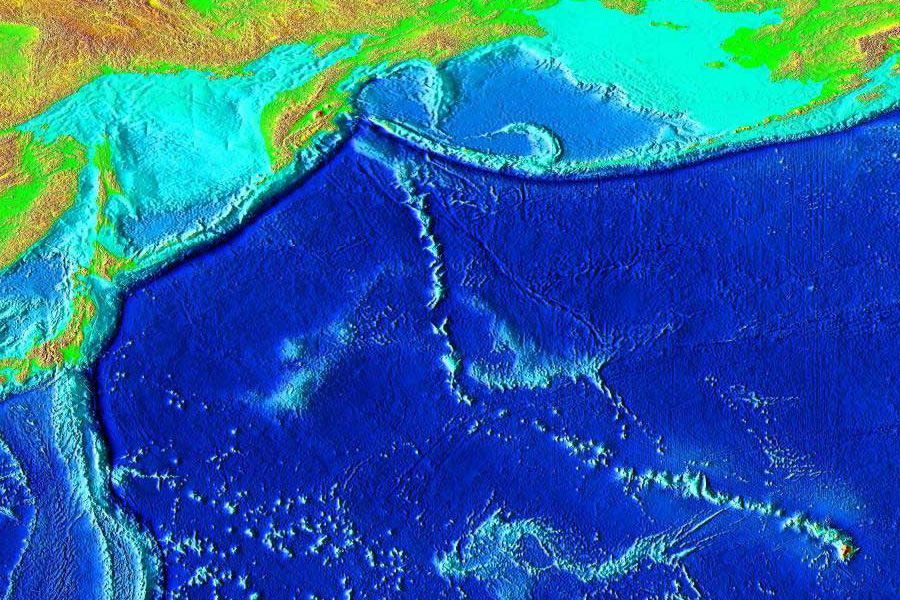
The Hawaiian-Emperor seamount chain on an Elevation World Map.

Kanmu Seamount is a seamount lying within the Hawaiian-Emperor seamount chain in the Pacific Ocean. The last eruption of Kanmu Seamount is unknown.

== See also ==
- List of volcanoes in the Hawaiian – Emperor seamount chain
