= Yomei Seamount =

Seamount of the Hawaiian-Emperor seamount chain in the northern Pacific Ocean

Coordinates: 42°20′N 170°07′E

Yomei Seamount is a seamount of the Hawaiian-Emperor seamount chain in the northern Pacific Ocean.

Its eruption ages are unknown, but the seamounts on either side are in the 56.2 to 59.6 million range during the Paleogene Period.

== See also ==
- List of volcanoes in the Hawaiian – Emperor seamount chain
