= Evolution of Hawaiian volcanoes =

Processes of growth and erosion of the volcanoes of the Hawaiian islands

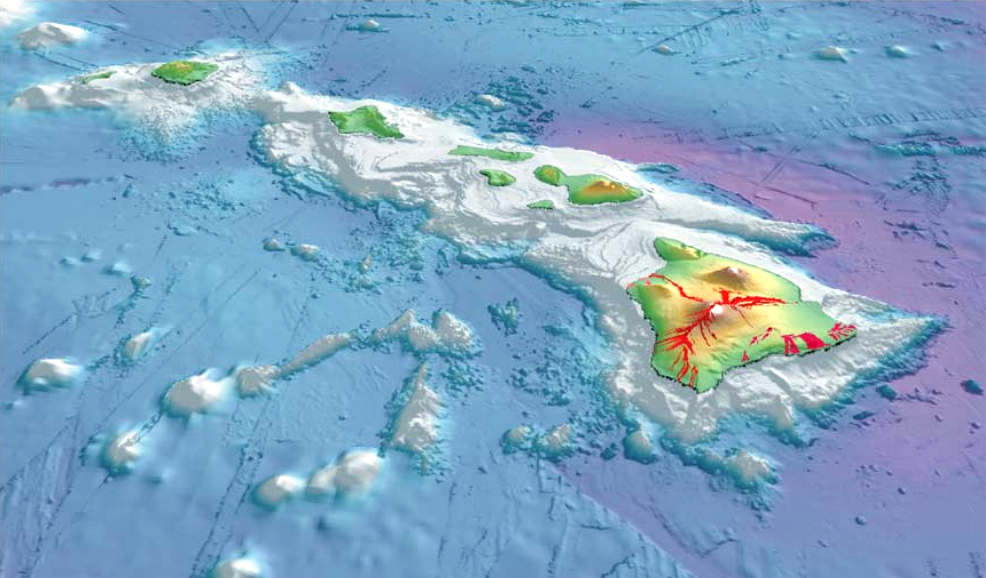
3-D perspective view of the southeastern Hawaiian Islands, with the white summits of Mauna Loa (4,170 m or 13,680 ft high) and Mauna Kea (4,206 m or 13,799 ft high)

The evolution of Hawaiian volcanoes occurs in several stages of growth and decline. The fifteen volcanoes that make up the eight principal islands of Hawaii are the youngest in a chain of more than 129 volcanoes that stretch 5,800 kilometers (3,600 mi) across the North Pacific Ocean, called the Hawaiian–Emperor seamount chain. Hawaiʻi's volcanoes rise an average of 4,600 meters (15,000 ft) to reach sea level from their base. The largest, Mauna Loa, is 4,169 meters (13,678 ft) high. As shield volcanoes, they are built by accumulated lava flows, growing a few meters or feet at a time to form a broad and gently sloping shape.

Hawaiian islands undergo a systematic pattern of submarine and subaerial growth that is followed by erosion. An island's stage of development reflects its distance from the Hawaii hotspot.

== Background ==
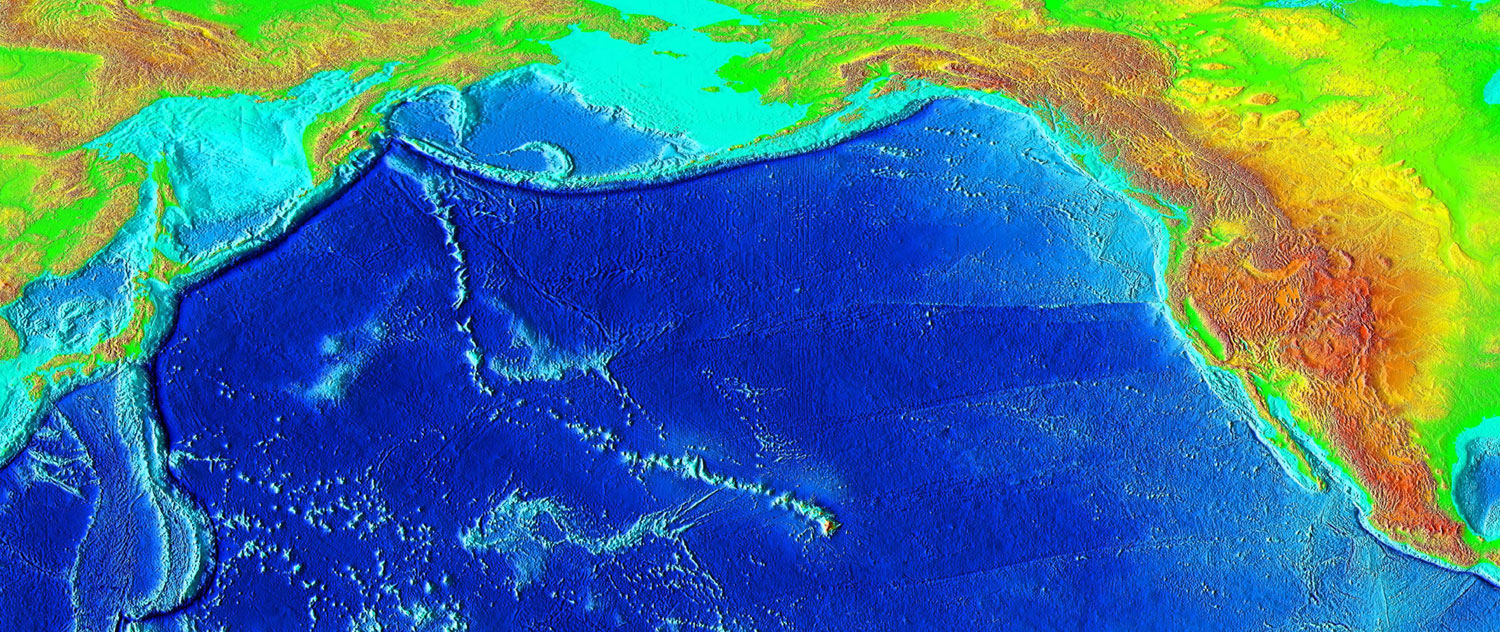
The characteristic "V" shape, a separation between the older Emperor and newer Hawaiian sections, is easily visible in this image

The Hawaiian–Emperor seamount chain is remarkable for its length and its number of volcanoes. The chain is split into two subsections across a break, separating the older Emperor Seamount Chain from the younger Hawaiian Ridge; the V-shaped bend of the chain is easily noticeable on maps. The volcanoes are progressively younger to the southeast; the oldest dated volcano, located at the northern end, is 81 million years old. The break between the two subchains is 43 million years old; in comparison, the oldest of the principal islands, Kauaʻi, is little more than 5 million years old.

The "assembly line" that forms the volcanoes is driven by a hotspot, a plume of magma deep within the Earth producing lava at the surface. As the Pacific Plate moves in a west-northwest direction, each volcano moves with it away from its place of origin above the hotspot. The age and location of the volcanoes are a record of the direction, rate of movement, and orientation of the Pacific Plate. The pronounced 43-million-year-old break separating the Hawaiian Ridge from the Emperor Chain marks a dramatic change in direction of plate movement.

Initial, deeper-water volcanic eruptions are characterized by pillow lava, so named for their shape, while shallow-water eruptions tend to be composed mainly of volcanic ash. Once the volcano is high enough so as to eliminate interference from water, its lava flows become those of ropey pāhoehoe and blocky ʻAʻā lava.

Our current understanding of the process of evolution originates from the first half of the 20th century. The understanding of the process was advanced by frequent observation of volcanic eruptions, study of contrasting rock types, and reconnaissance mapping. More recently our understanding has been aided by geophysical studies, offshore submersible studies, the advent of radioactive dating, advances in petrology and geochemistry, advanced surveillance and monitoring, and detailed geological studies. The ratio of magnesium to silica in the lava is a sign of what stage the volcano is in, as over time the volcano's lavas shift from alkalic to tholeiitic lava, and then back to alkalic.

Although volcanism and erosion are the chief factors in the growth and denudation of a volcano, other factors are also involved. Subsidence is known to occur. Changes in sea level, occurring mostly during the Pleistocene, have caused drastic changes; an example is the breakup of Maui Nui, initially a seven-volcano island, which was transformed into five islands as a result of subsidence. High rainfall due to the trade wind effect impacts on the severity of erosion on many of the major volcanoes. Coastline collapses, a notable part of the history of many of the Hawaiian volcanoes, are often devastating and destroy large parts of the volcanoes.

== Submarine preshield stage ==
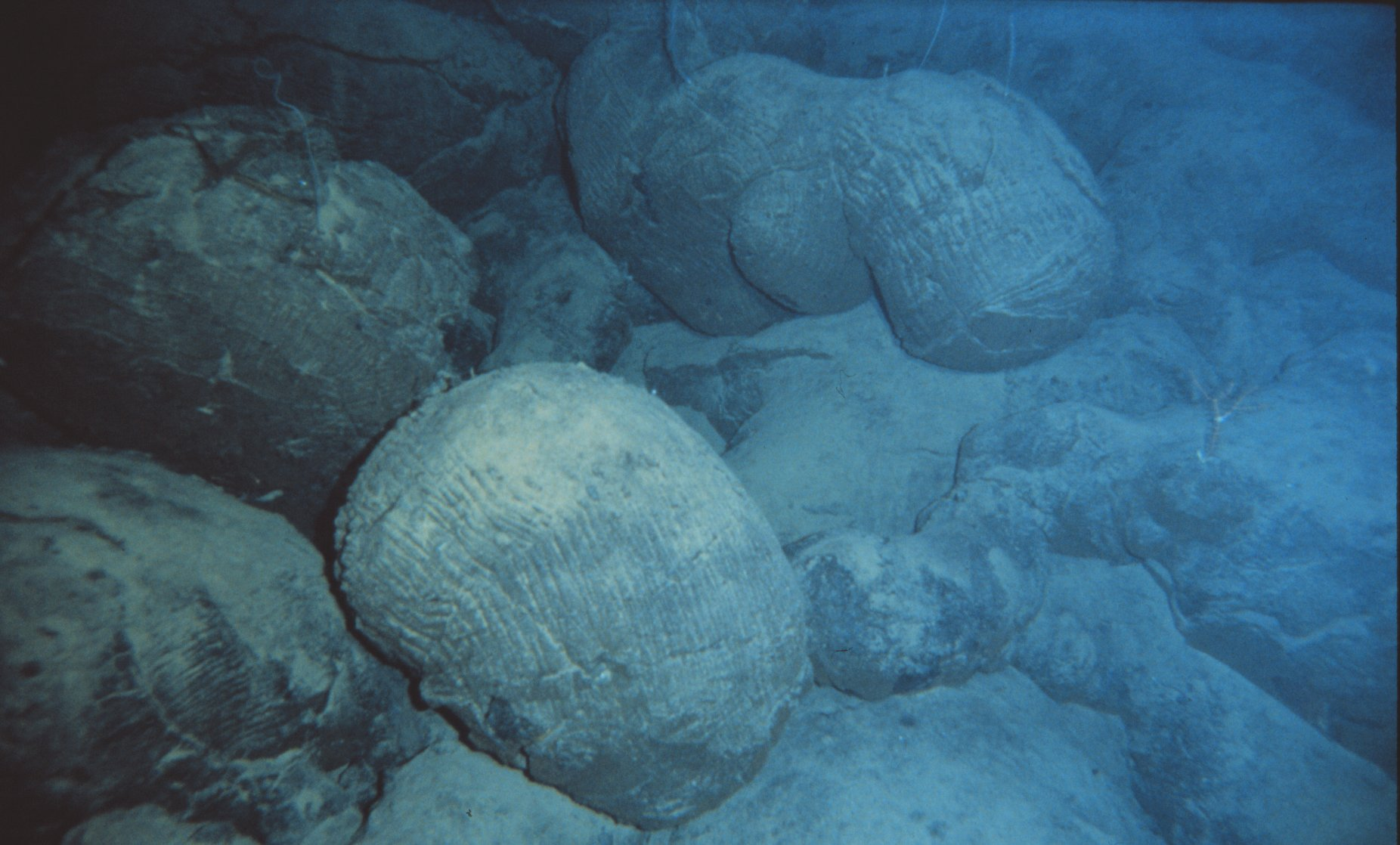
Pillow lava, the typical type of flow from submarine volcanoes

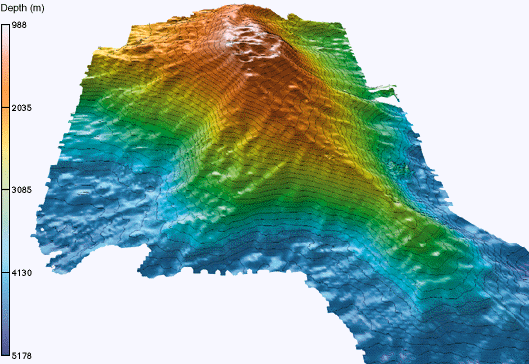
Bathymetric rendering of Kamaʻehuakanaloa Seamount (formerly Lōʻihi), the only known Hawaiian volcano that is currently still in the preshield stage

When a volcano is created near the Hawaiian hotspot, it begins its growth in the submarine preshield stage, characterized by infrequent, typically low volume eruptions. The volcano is steep-sided, and it usually has a defined caldera and has two or more rift zones radiating from the summit. The type of lava erupted in this stage of activity is alkali basalt. Due to stretching forces, the development of two or more rift zones is common. The lava accumulates in a shallow magma storage reservoir.

Because the eruptions occur with the volcano underwater, the form of lava typically erupted is pillow lava. Pillow lava is rounded balls of lava that was given very little time to cool due to immediate exposure to water. Water pressure prevents the lava from exploding upon contact with the cold ocean water, forcing it to simmer and solidify quickly. This stage is thought to last about 200,000 years, but lavas erupted during this stage make up only a tiny fraction of the final volume of the volcano. As time progresses, eruptions become stronger and more frequent.

The only example of a Hawaiian volcano in this stage is Kamaʻehuakanaloa Seamount (formerly Lōʻihi), which is thought to be transitioning from the submarine preshield stage into the submarine phase of the shield stage. All older volcanoes have had their preshield stage lavas buried by younger lavas, so everything that is known about this stage comes from research done on Kamaʻehuakanaloa.

== Shield stages ==
The shield stage of the volcano is subdivided into three phases: the submarine, explosive, and subaerial. During this stage of growth, the volcano accumulates about 95 percent of its mass and it takes on the "shield" shape that shield volcanoes are named for. It is also the stage at which the volcano's eruptive frequency reaches its peak.

=== Submarine phase ===
As eruptions become more and more frequent at the end of the preshield stage, the composition of the lava erupted from the Hawaiian volcano changes from alkalic basalt to tholeiitic basalt and the volcano enters the submarine phase of the shield stage. In this phase, the volcano continues to erupt pillow lava. Calderas form, fill, and reform at the volcano's summit and the rift zones remain prominent. The volcano builds its way up to sea level. The submarine phase ends when the volcano is only shallowly submerged.

The only example of a volcano in this stage is Kamaʻehuakanaloa Seamount, which is now transitioning into this phase from the preshield stage.

=== Explosive phase ===
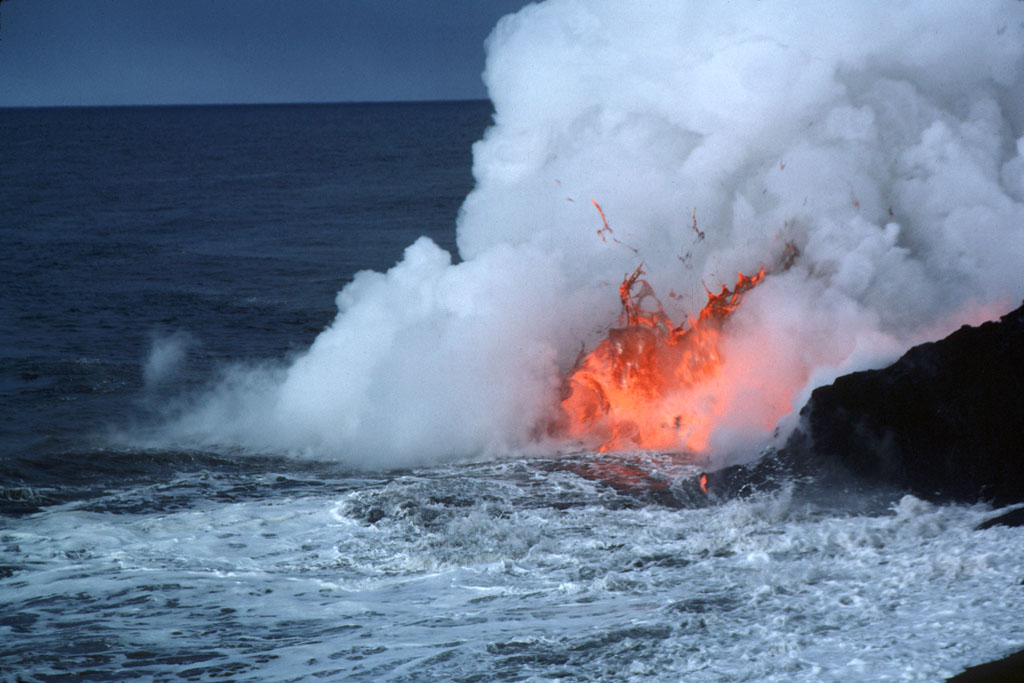
Lava bubbling explosively as it hits cold ocean water near Kupapaʻu Point

This volcanic phase, so named for the explosive reactions with lava that take place, begins when the volcano just breaches the surface. The pressure and instantaneous cooling of being underwater stops, replaced instead by contact with air. Lava and seawater make intermittent contact, resulting in a lot of steam. The change in environment also engenders a change in lava type, and the lava from this stage is mostly fragmented into volcanic ash. These explosive eruptions continue intermittently for several hundred thousand years. Calderas continually develop and fill, and rift zones remain prominent. The phase ends when the volcano has sufficient mass and height (about 1,000 meters (3,000 ft) above sea level) that the interaction between sea water and erupting lava fades away.

=== Subaerial phase ===
Once a volcano has added enough mass and height to end frequent contact with water, the subaerial substage begins. During this stage of activity, the explosive eruptions become much less frequent and the nature of the eruptions become much more gentle. Lava flows are a combination of pāhoehoe and ʻaʻā. It is during this stage, that the low-profile "shield" shape of Hawaiian volcanoes is formed, named for the shape of a warrior's shield. Eruption rates and frequencies peak, and about 95% of the volcano's eventual volume forms during a period of roughly 500,000 years.

The lava erupted in this stage form flows of pāhoehoe or ʻaʻā. During this subaerial stage, the flanks of the growing volcanoes are unstable and as a result, large landslides may occur. At least 17 major landslides have occurred around the major Hawaiian islands. This stage is arguably the most well-studied, as all eruptions that occurred in the 20th century on the island of Hawaii were produced by volcanoes in this phase.

Mauna Loa and Kīlauea volcanoes are in this phase of activity.

== Postshield stage ==
Hawaiian eruption: 1: Ash plume, 2: Lava fountain, 3: Crater, 4: Lava lake, 5: Fumaroles, 6: Lava flow, 7 Layers of lava and ash, 8: Stratum, 9: Sill, 10: Magma conduit, 11: Magma chamber, 12: Dike

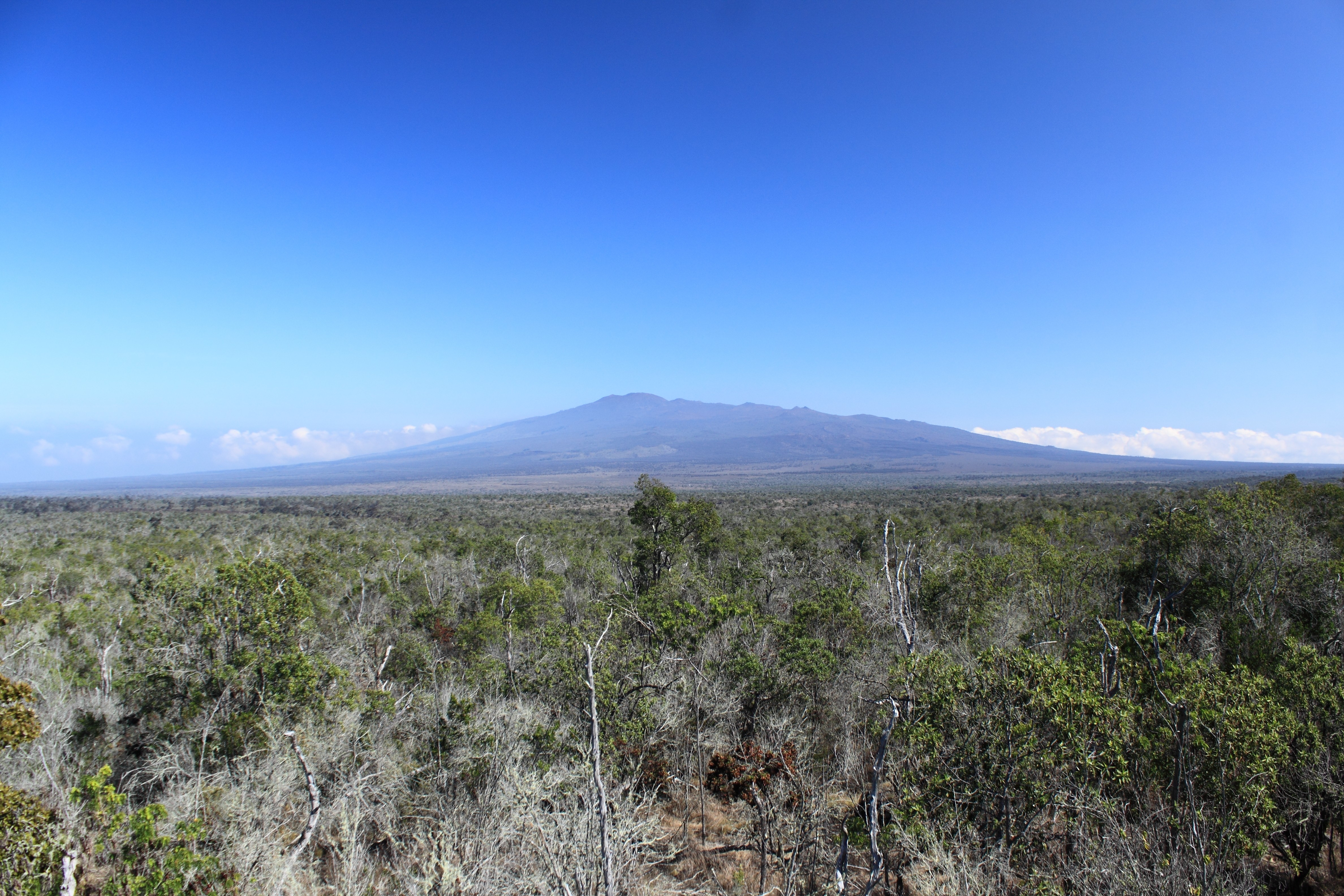
The outline of Hualālai, showing the steeper slopes and cinder cones of a volcano in the post-shield stage

As the volcano reaches the end of the shield stage, the volcano goes through another series of changes as it enters the postshield stage. The type of lava erupted changes from tholeiitic basalt back to alkalic basalt and eruptions become slightly more explosive.

Eruptions in the postshield stage cap the volcano with a carapace of lava, containing low silica and high alkali contents, the reverse of the stage before it. Some Hawaiian volcanoes diverge from this, however. Lava is erupted as stocky, pasty ʻaʻā flows along with a lot of cinder. Caldera development stops, and the rift zones become less active. The new lava flows increase the slope grade, as the ʻaʻā never reaches the base of the volcano. These lavas commonly fill and overflow the caldera. Eruption rate gradually decreases over a period of about 250,000 years, eventually stopping altogether as the volcano becomes dormant.

Mauna Kea, Hualālai, and Haleakalā volcanoes are in this stage of activity.

== Erosional stage ==
After the volcano becomes dormant, the forces of erosion gain control of the mountain. The volcano subsides into the oceanic crust due to its immense weight and loses elevation. Meanwhile, rain also erodes the volcano, creating deeply incised valleys. Coral reefs grow along the shoreline. The volcano becomes a skeleton of its former self.

Kohala, Māhukona, Lānaʻi, and Waiʻanae volcanoes are examples of volcanoes in this stage of development.

== Rejuvenated stage ==
After a long period of dormancy and erosion of the surface, the volcano may become active again, entering a final stage of activity called the rejuvenated stage. During this stage, the volcano erupts small volumes of lava very infrequently. These eruptions are often spread out over several millions of years. The composition of the lavas erupted in this stage is usually alkalic. The stage commonly occurs between 0.6 and 2 million years after it has entered the weathering cycle.

The Koʻolau Range and West Maui volcanoes are examples of volcanoes in this stage of development. Note, however, that because in this stage eruptions are very infrequent (occurring thousands or even tens of thousands of years apart), erosion is still the primary factor controlling the volcano's development. After this stage the volcano becomes extinct and never erupts again.

== Coral atoll stage ==
An animated sequence showing the erosion and subsidence of a volcano, and the formation of a coral reef around it – eventually resulting in an atoll.

Eventually, erosion and subsidence break the volcano down to sea level. At this point, the volcano becomes an atoll, with a ring of coral and sand islands surrounding a lagoon. All the Hawaiian islands west of the Gardner Pinnacles in the Northwestern Hawaiian Islands are in this stage.

Atolls are the product of the growth of tropical marine organisms, so this island type is only found in warm tropical waters. Eventually, the Pacific Plate carries the volcanic atoll into waters too cold for these marine organisms to maintain a coral reef by growth. Volcanic islands located beyond the warm water temperature requirements of reef-building organisms become seamounts as they subside and are eroded away at the surface. An island that is located where the ocean water temperatures are just sufficiently warm for upward reef growth to keep pace with the rate of subsidence is said to be at the Darwin point. Islands in more northerly latitudes evolve towards seamounts or guyots; islands closer to the equator evolve towards atolls (see Kure Atoll).

== Guyot stage and destruction phase ==
After the reef dies, the volcano subsides or erodes below sea level and becomes a coral-capped seamount. These flat-topped seamounts are called guyots. Most, if not all, of the volcanoes west of Kure Atoll, as well as most, if not all, of the volcanoes in the Emperor Seamount chain, are guyots or seamounts. Eventually the guyot will be taken to a subduction plate where it will be destroyed like Meiji Seamount in a few million years.

== Other patterns ==
Not all Hawaiian volcanoes go through all of these stages of activity. An example is Koʻolau Range on Oʻahu, which was prehistorically devastated by a cataclysmic landslide, never underwent the postshield stage and went dormant for hundreds of thousands of years after the shield stage before coming back to life. Some volcanoes never made it above sea level; there is no evidence to suggest that West Molokai went through the rejuvenated stage, while its younger neighbors, East Molokai and West Maui, have evidently done so. It is currently unknown what stage of development the submerged volcano of Penguin Bank is in.

== Application to other groups ==
In recent years research at other seamounts, for instance Jasper Seamount (off the west coast of Mexico), has confirmed that the Hawaiian model applies to other seamounts as well.

== See also ==
- Geology of the Canary Islands – a group of volcanic islands in the Atlantic Ocean that follow a similar sequence of growth and decline stages
- List of volcanoes in the Hawaiian – Emperor seamount chain
