= Kimmei Seamount =

Seamount of the Hawaiian-Emperor seamount chain in the northern Pacific Ocean

Coordinates: 35°00′N 171°40′E

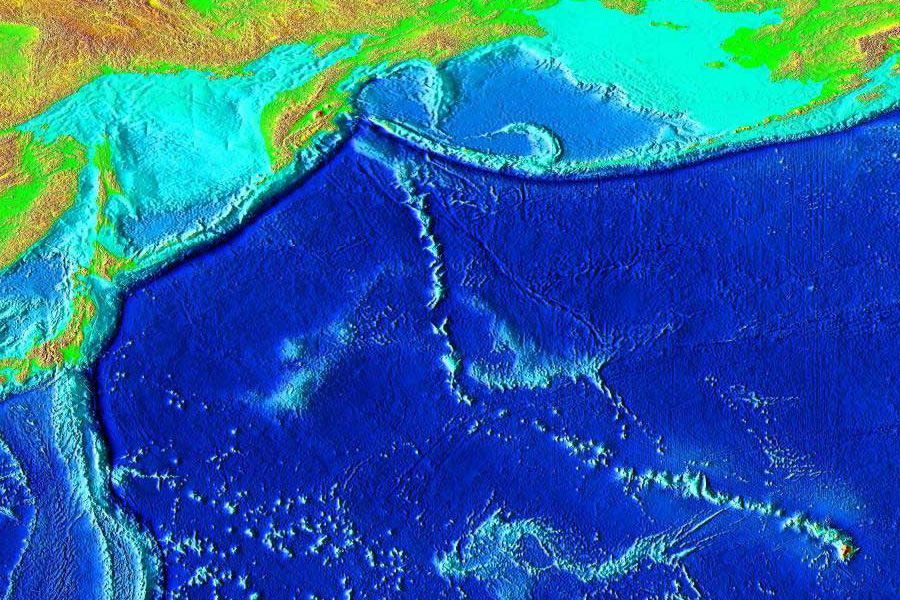
Kimmei seamount chain on an Elevation World Map.

Kimmei Seamount is a seamount of the Hawaiian-Emperor seamount chain in the northern Pacific Ocean. It last erupted about 40 million years ago.

== See also ==
- List of volcanoes in the Hawaiian – Emperor seamount chain
