= Penguin Bank =

Now-submerged shield volcano of the Hawaiian Islands

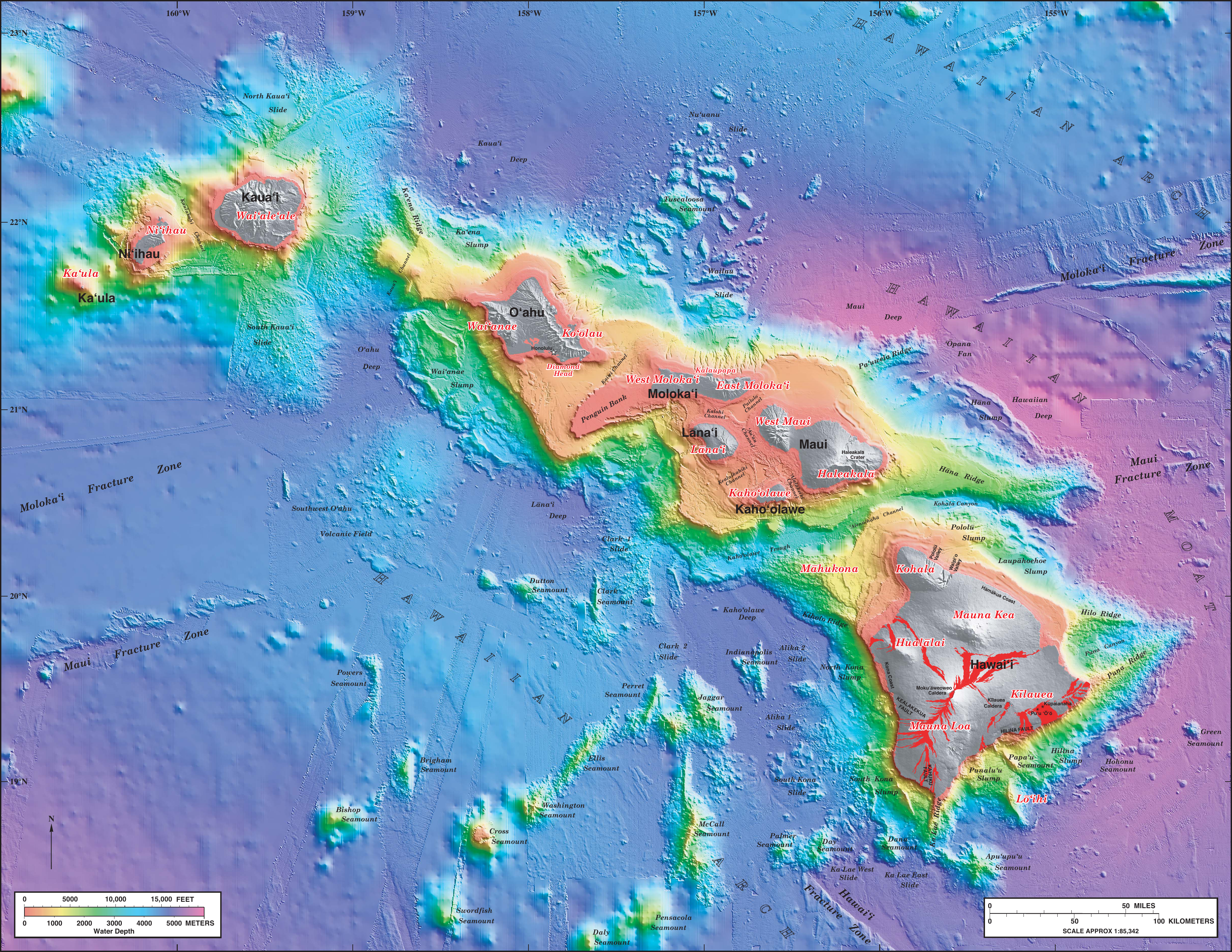
Bathymetry image of the Hawaiian Islands. The location of this volcano is the light red area immediately west of Moloka'i.

Penguin Bank is the name given to a now-submerged shield volcano of the Hawaiian Islands. Its coral-capped remains lie immediately west of the island of Molokaʻi, under relatively shallow water (see bathymetric map at the right).

== Geology ==
The Penguin Bank volcano is part of the Hawaiian-Emperor seamount chain. It was one of the seven principal Cenozoic Era volcanoes that formerly constituted the prehistoric island of Maui Nui, along with West Molokaʻi, East Molokaʻi, Lānaʻi, West Maui, East Maui, and Kahoʻolawe. The date of the last eruption is unknown, but shield-building eruptions likely ended entirely 2 million years ago with no evidence of a rejuvenated stage.

This volcano like all other volcanoes of the Hawaiian-Emperor Seamount Chain would have formed in a series of stages such as pre-shield, shield-building/subaerial, and post-shield that was divided into two rift-zones broken by a summit caldera. This volcano could have stood roughly 4,000 to 7,000 feet above sea level. However, Penguin Bank could have produced low viscosity lava and would therefore be broader in comparison to its former height (making it no more than 3,000 feet).

Penguin Bank was once thought to be an extended rift-zone of the West Molokai volcano, but the discovery of Kaena ridge being an independent volcano located off the coast of western Oahu likely influenced this ocean bank to be an independent volcano as well. Unlike Kaena, Penguin Bank wasn't fully proven to be independent from neighboring volcanos.

There is a visible appearance of a landslide that may have occurred on the southeastern flank of the Penguin Bank volcano that occurred about 1.5 million years ago. However, there is a possibility that shield-building eruptions favored a Northern/Northwestern path and the slide scarps from the supposed landslide would instead be evidence for subaerial erosion.

== Boundary area ==
Penguin Bank is about 20 miles (32 km) long and 10 miles (16 km) wide and less than 200 feet (61 m) deep. The site coordinates are: NW (21°03′N 157°42′W); NE (21°12′N 157°24′W); SW (20°54′N 157°36′W); and SE (21°03′N 157°21′W).

== Conservation ==
Plans to build wind turbines on Penguin Bank were called off in April 2009, because the site is located in the heart of the Hawaiian Islands Humpback Whale National Marine Sanctuary, requiring a lease from the then-active Minerals Management Service (MMS). However, the MMS would not issue leases within marine sanctuaries, effectively killing the project.
