= Kaʻena Ridge =

Remnant of an ancient shield volcano

- Location within Hawaii

Highest point
- Elevation: −3,937 ft (−1,200 m)
- Coordinates: 21°49′19″N 158°46′19″W

Geography
- Location: Hawaii US

Geology
- Mountain type: Submerged shield volcano
- Last eruption: 1956?

Kaʻena Ridge, also referred to as the Kaʻena Volcano, is a submerged remnant of an ancient shield volcano that is to the north of and once comprised the northern section of the Hawaiian Island of Oʻahu.

== Geology ==
Kaʻena Ridge was the oldest of the three volcanoes to form Oʻahu and it was also the shortest when it grew out of sea level. It was about 3,000 ft.

Activity from Kaʻena began roughly 5 million years ago. Despite being Oʻahu's oldest volcano, it broke sea level 400,000 years after the Waiʻanae did. This is due to Kaʻena being built on a lower sea depth, whereas other Oʻahu volcanoes were built on pre-existing ridges.

Around 3 million years ago, Kaʻena, Waiʻanae and Koʻolau simultaneously emerged. Kaʻena would later submerge below sea level at an unknown date.

In its current state, the crest of the Kaʻena Ridge extends 35–55 km wide and is located 75–100 km northwest of Kaʻena Point, the westernmost tip of Oʻahu.

== History ==
On May 22, 1956, a military plane flying to Oʻahu reported brown pumice floating on the water and a smell of sulfur. One of the pilots reported it looked similar to volcanic eruption he had witnessed in the Philippines in 1952. Subsequent flights were flown out, and pilots reported yellow-colored water around Kaʻena Ridge. Within days, brown pumice began washing up on the shores of Oʻahu, and dead whales were reported around the area. A 1991 study found that lava had recently erupted in the area but couldn't determine the exact date, but it did state that an eruption in the 1900s could have occurred, or the volcanism may have occurred in the past 1,000 years. The most likely explanation for this event by scientists is a rejuvenation stage volcanic eruption. If this is the case it would be the only time that a rejuvenation stage eruption was witnessed by humans.

== See also ==
- List of volcanoes in the Hawaiian – Emperor seamount chain
