= Ojin Seamount =

Guyot of the Hawaiian-Emperor seamount chain in the Pacific Ocean

Coordinates: 38°15′N 171°00′E

Ōjin Seamount, also called Ōjin Guyot, named after Emperor Ōjin, 15th Emperor of Japan, is a guyot of the Hawaiian-Emperor seamount chain in the Pacific Ocean. It erupted 55 million years ago.

== See also ==
- List of volcanoes in the Hawaiian – Emperor seamount chain
