= West Maui Mountains =

Mountains in Hawaii, United States

West Maui Volcano
- Mauna Kahālāwai
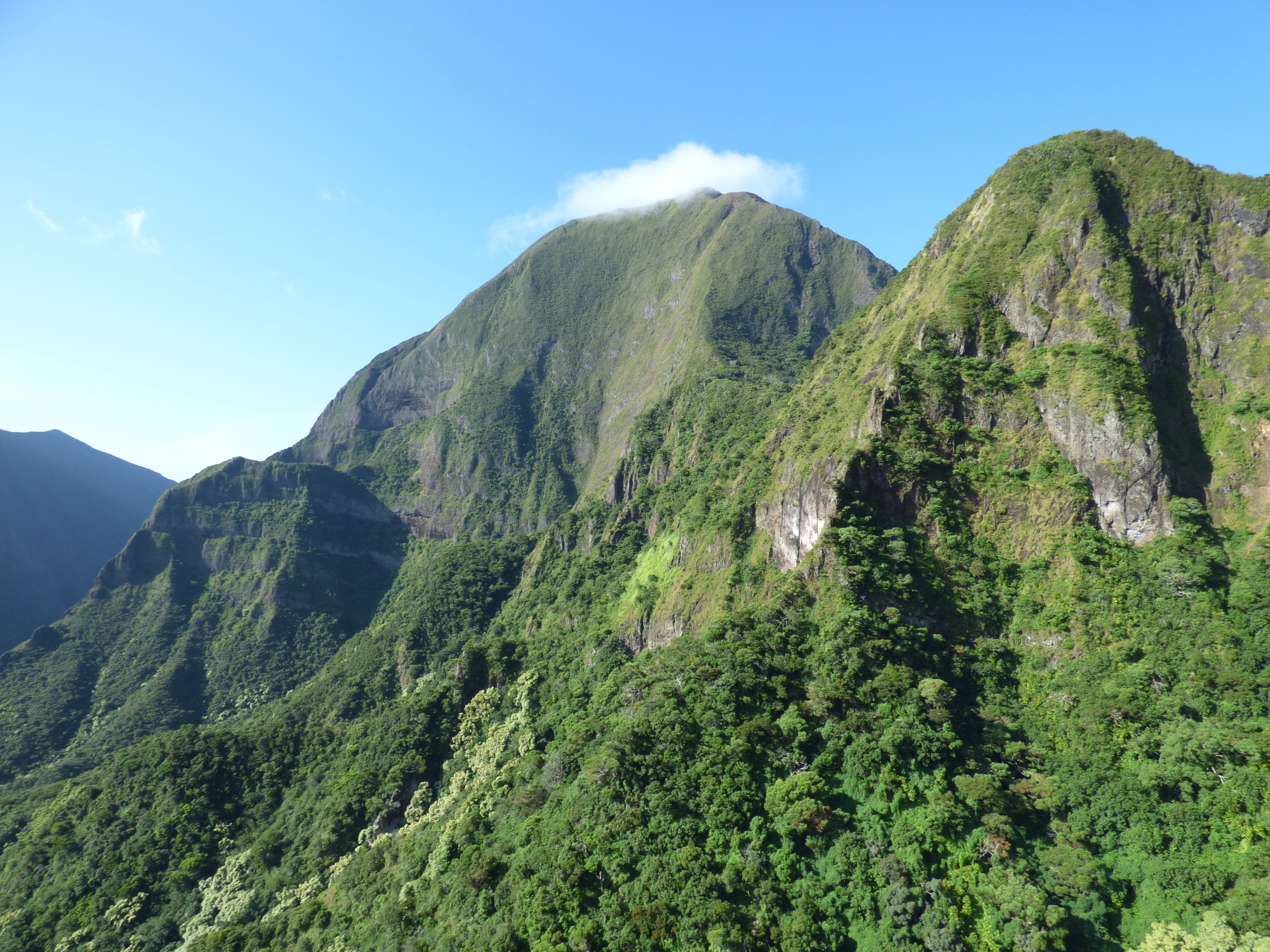
- Lihau (center) and Helu (right) peaks

Highest point
- Elevation: 5,788 ft (1,764 m)
- Prominence: 5,668 ft (1,728 m)
- Coordinates: 20°53′37″N 156°35′22″W

Geography
- Location within Hawaii
- Location: Maui, Hawaii, U.S.
- Parent range: Hawaiian Islands
- Topo map: USGS Kilohana (HI)

Geology
- Rock age: 1.32 Mega-annum
- Mountain type: Much eroded shield volcano
- Volcanic zone: Hawaiian-Emperor seamount chain
- Last eruption: 320,000 years

The West Maui Mountains, West Maui Volcano, or Mauna Kahālāwai (which means "holding house of water") are the remnants of an eroded shield volcano that constitutes the western quarter of Maui. Approximately 1.7 million years old, the volcano's last eruption was approximately 320,000 years ago. Thanks to hundreds of inches of rainfall annually the mountains have undergone substantial stream erosion. The ʻĪao Valley, and its ʻĪao Needle are popular attractions within the mountains and are accessible from Wailuku.

The three districts (moku) of West Maui are Lahaina, Kāʻanapali, and Wailuku. Wailuku is also known as "Pūʻalikomohana" ("west isthmus"), or "Nā Wai ʻEhā" ("the four waters"). The port of Lahaina lies on the southwestern slope.

The summit peak at 5,788 ft (1,764 m) elevation is called "Puʻu Kukui," which translates to "candlenut hill".

== Geological history ==
The West Maui Mountains were formed through at least three series of major volcanic eruptions during its shield building period. Rocks from the latest major shield-building eruptions are called the Honolua volcanic series, which are roughly 500,000 years old. However, there were several rejuvenated stage eruptions more recently, the last dating to roughly 320,000 years ago.

== Puʻu Kukui Watershed Preserve ==
The Puʻu Kukui Preserve is the largest private nature preserve in the State of Hawaii, dedicated to protecting the watershed lands of the West Maui Mountains. Established in 1988, the 8,661-acre (35.05 km^{2}) preserve has been managed since 1994 by Maui Land & Pineapple Company in participation with The Nature Conservancy and the State Natural Area Partnership.
