= Suiko Seamount =

Guyot of the Hawaiian-Emperor seamount chain in the Pacific Ocean

- Summit depth: 951 metres (3,120 ft)
- Height: 4,500 metres (14,800 ft)
- Summit area: 3,250 square kilometres (1,250 mi^{2})

Location
- Location: North Pacific Ocean
- Coordinates: 44°35′00″N 170°20′00″E

Geology
- Type: Guyot
- Volcanic arc/chain: Hawaiian-Emperor seamount chain

Suiko Seamount, also called Suiko Guyot, is a guyot of the Hawaiian-Emperor seamount chain in the Pacific Ocean.

== The name ==
Suiko Seamount was named by in 1954, and in 1967 the name was approved by the United States Board on Geographic Names. The 33rd Emperor of Japan was Empress Suiko, who reigned from 593 to 628.

== Geology ==
The last eruption from Suiko Seamount occurred 60 million years ago, during the Paleogene Period of the Cenozoic Era.

Suiko Seamount rises 4,500 metres (14,800 ft) from the floor of the Pacific, to 951 metres (3,120 ft) from the ocean's surface.
