= West Molokaʻi Volcano =

Extinct volcano in Hawaii

- Mauna Loa

Highest point
- Elevation: 421 m (1,381 ft)
- Coordinates: 21.13°N 157.20°W

Geography
- Location: Molokaʻi, Hawaii, United States
- Parent range: Hawaiian Islands

Geology
- Rock age: Pleistocene epoch
- Mountain type: Shield volcano
- Volcanic zone: Hawaiian-Emperor seamount chain

West Molokaʻi Volcano, sometimes called Mauna Loa for the census-designated place, is an extinct shield volcano comprising the western half of Molokaʻi island in the U.S. state of Hawaii.

== Geology ==
It was formed in two volcanic phases during the Pleistocene epoch of the Quaternary period in the Cenozoic Era.

The first formed the broad tholeiitic shield volcano of West Molokaʻi that ended 1.89 million years ago. The second volcanic phase produced postshield alkalic volcanics 1.76 million years ago. There is no evidence for a rejuvenated phase of the West Molokaʻi Volcano, whilst the East Molokaʻi Volcano does.

West Molokaʻi overlaps the western flank of East Molokaʻi Volcano, a much larger shield volcano comprising two-thirds of Molokaʻi. Two distinct rift zones are present on the western flank of the volcano, forming a v shape. A third rift zone possibly extended eastward towards the modern day East Molokaʻi Volcano. A collapse occurred around (uncertain) years ago on the eastern/north eastern flank of the volcano and lava flows from East Molokaʻi had filled in the open space, connecting the two volcanoes above surface (also known as the Molokaʻi Saddle). The cliffs of the eastern side of West Molokaʻi is the only remaining evidence for this land slip. Keep note that the West Molokaʻi slip is completely separate from the much larger slip of the East Molokaʻi Volcano.
