= Guyot =

Flat-topped underwater mountain

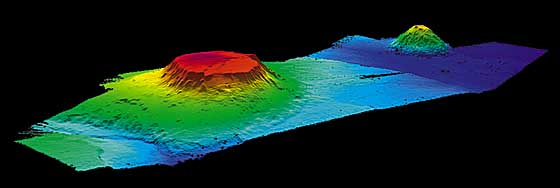
The Bear Seamount (left), a guyot in the northern Atlantic Ocean

In marine geology, a guyot (English: /ɡiːˈjoʊ/ ghee-YOH, French: [ɡɥijo]), also called a tablemount, is an isolated underwater volcanic mountain (seamount) with a flat top more than 200 m (660 ft) below the surface of the sea. The diameters of these flat summits can exceed 10 km (6 mi). Guyots are most commonly found in the Pacific Ocean, but they have been identified in all the oceans except the Arctic Ocean. They are analogous to tables (such as mesas) on land.

== History ==
Guyots were first recognized in 1945 by Harry Hammond Hess, who collected data using echo-sounding equipment on a ship he commanded during World War II. His data showed that some undersea mountains had flat tops. Hess called these undersea mountains "guyots" after Guyot Hall (now Schmidt Hall), the former Department of Geosciences building at Princeton University named after Arnold Henry Guyot. Hess postulated they were once volcanic islands that were beheaded by wave action, yet they are now deep under sea level. This idea was used to help bolster the theory of plate tectonics.

== Formation ==
Guyots show evidence of having once been above the surface, with gradual subsidence through stages from fringed reefed mountain, coral atoll, and finally a flat-topped submerged mountain. Seamounts are made by extrusion of lavas piped upward in stages from sources within the Earth's mantle, usually hotspots, to vents on the seafloor. The volcanism invariably ceases after a time, and other processes dominate. When an undersea volcano grows high enough to be near or breach the ocean surface, wave action or coral reef growth tend to create a flat-topped edifice. However, all ocean crust and guyots form from hot magma or rock, which cools over time. As the lithosphere that the future guyot rides on slowly cools, it becomes denser and sinks lower into Earth's mantle, through the process of isostasy. In addition, the erosive effects of waves and currents are found mostly near the surface: the tops of guyots generally lie below this higher-erosion zone.

This is the same process that gives rise to higher seafloor topography at oceanic ridges, such as the Mid-Atlantic Ridge in the Atlantic Ocean, and deeper ocean at abyssal plains and oceanic trenches, such as the Mariana Trench. Thus, the island or shoal that will eventually become a guyot slowly subsides over millions of years. In the right climatic regions, coral growth can sometimes keep pace with the subsidence, resulting in coral atoll formation, but eventually the corals dip too deep to grow and the island becomes a guyot. The greater the amount of time that passes, the deeper the guyots become.

Seamounts provide data on movements of tectonic plates on which they ride, and on the rheology of the underlying lithosphere. The trend of a seamount chain traces the direction of motion of the lithospheric plate over a more or less fixed heat source in the underlying asthenosphere, the part of the Earth's mantle beneath the lithosphere. There are thought to be up to an estimated 50,000 seamounts in the Pacific basin. The Hawaiian–Emperor seamount chain is an excellent example of an entire volcanic chain undergoing this process, from active volcanism, to coral reef growth, to atoll formation, to subsidence of the islands and becoming guyots.

== Characteristics ==
The steepness gradient of most guyots is about 20 degrees. To technically be considered a guyot or tablemount, they must stand at least 900 m (3,000 ft) tall. One guyot in particular, the Great Meteor Tablemount in the Northeast Atlantic Ocean, stands at more than 4,000 m (13,000 ft) high, with a diameter of 110 km (68 mi). However, there are many undersea mounts that can range from just less than 90 m (300 ft) to around 900 m (3,000 ft). Very large oceanic volcanic constructions, hundreds of kilometres across, are called oceanic plateaus. Guyots have a mean area of 3,313 km^{2} (1,279 sq mi), which is much larger than typical seamounts, which have a mean area of 790 km^{2} (310 sq mi).

There are 283 known guyots in the world's oceans, with the North Pacific having 119, the South Pacific 77, the South Atlantic 43, the Indian Ocean 28, the North Atlantic eight, the Southern Ocean six, and the Mediterranean Sea two; there are none known in the Arctic Ocean, though one is found along the Fram Strait off northeastern Greenland. Guyots are also associated with specific lifeforms and varying amounts of organic matter. Local increases in chlorophyll a, enhanced carbon incorporation rates and changes in phytoplankton species composition are associated with guyots and other seamounts.

== See also ==
- Evolution of Hawaiian volcanoes
- Kodiak–Bowie Seamount chain
- New England Seamounts
