= Midnight Volcano =

Coordinates: 33.049040°N 90.573494°W

Midnight Volcano

Midnight Volcano is a buried extinct volcano in southern Humphreys County, Mississippi. It is named after the nearby town of Midnight, Mississippi. During the time it was active, Midnight Volcano may have been a volcanic island in the Mississippi Embayment.

The volcanic activity in the area is associated with the Monroe Uplift, and igneous rocks in the region have been dated from 84 to 73 Ma. A well drilled in Humphreys County found around 600 m (2000 ft) of volcanic rock, starting 1110 m (3641 ft) below the surface at the shallowest. The most recent measured volcanic rock was dated to 66 Ma, while older (and deeper) samples were dated at 81 and 94 Ma.

These most recent deposits roughly coincide with the activity of Jackson Volcano, another buried volcano southeast of Midnight

Volcanic debris from this volcanism was also found in the "Coffee sands", a Cretaceous sand layer to the north.

== See also ==
- Jackson Volcano
- Mississippi Embayment
- Bermuda Hotspot
- List of Volcanoes in the United States
