= Geography of Bermuda =

Bermuda
Nickname: The Rock or Devil's Isles
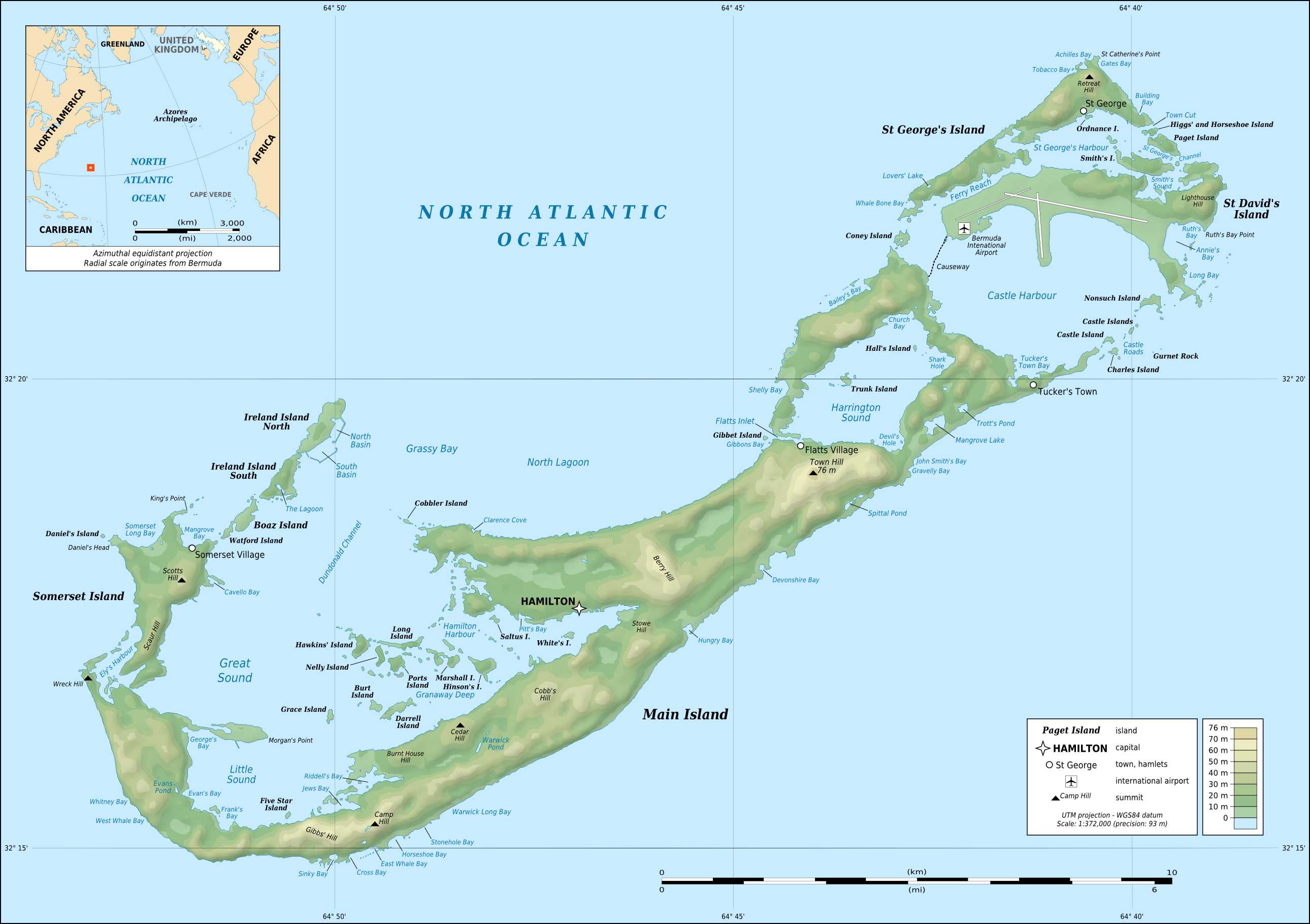
- Topographic map of Bermuda

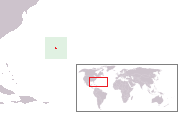

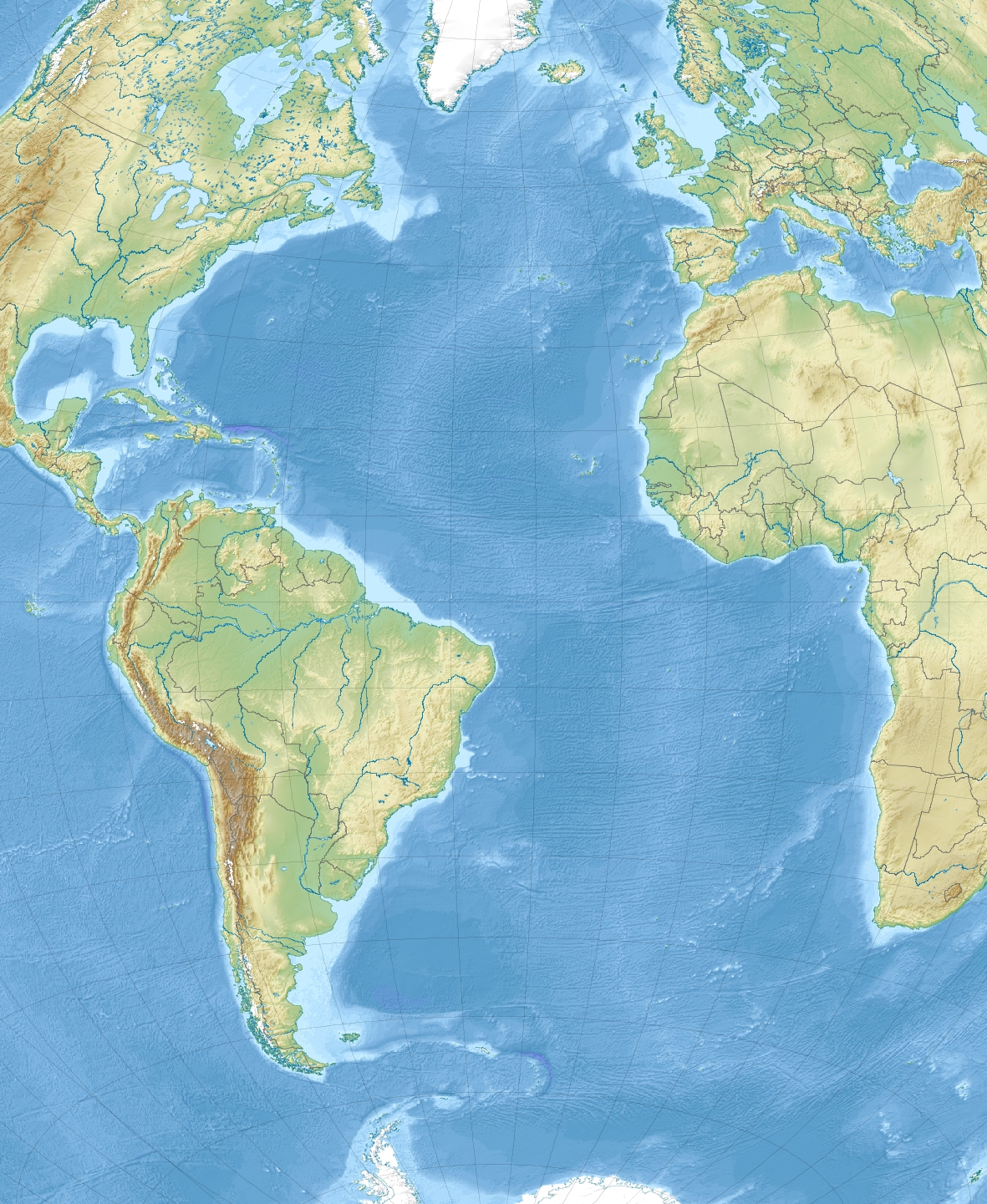
- Location within Bermuda Location within Atlantic Ocean

Geography
- Location: Atlantic Ocean
- Coordinates: 32°18′N 64°47′W
- Archipelago: Bermuda
- Total islands: 138
- Area: 53.3 km^{2} (20.6 sq mi)
- Coastline: 103 km (64 mi)
- Highest elevation: 76 m (249 ft)
- Highest point: Town Hill

Administration
- United Kingdom; Bermuda
- British Overseas Territory: Bermuda
- Largest settlement: Hamilton (pop. 1,500)

Demographics
- Population: 66,163 (2007)
- Ethnic groups: British, Sub-Saharan African, Portuguese, Amerindian

Bermuda (officially, The Bermuda Islands or The Somers Isles) is an overseas territory of the United Kingdom in the North Atlantic Ocean. Located off the east coast of the United States, it is situated around 1,770 km (1,100 mi) northeast of Miami, Florida, and 1,350 km (840 mi) south of Halifax, Nova Scotia, 1,750 km (1,090 mi) south-southwest of Saint Pierre and Miquelon (France), 3,089 km (1,919 mi) west of Fajã Grande, Ilha des Flores, Açores, Portugal, 3,051 km (1,896 mi) north-northwest of the Nascente do Panarî, Brazil (and 3,394 km (2,109 mi) from Oiapoque, Brazil), 1,759 km (1,093 mi) north of Havana, Cuba and north-northeast of San Juan, Puerto Rico. The nearest landmass is Cape Hatteras, North Carolina, about 1,040 km (650 mi) west-northwest, followed by Cape Sable Island, Nova Scotia, Canada 1,236 km (768 mi) northward. Although commonly referred to in the singular (i.e., The Island, The Rock, and Bermuda), the territory consists of approximately 138 islands, with a total area of 57 km^{2} (22 sq mi).

== Native terrestrial ecology ==
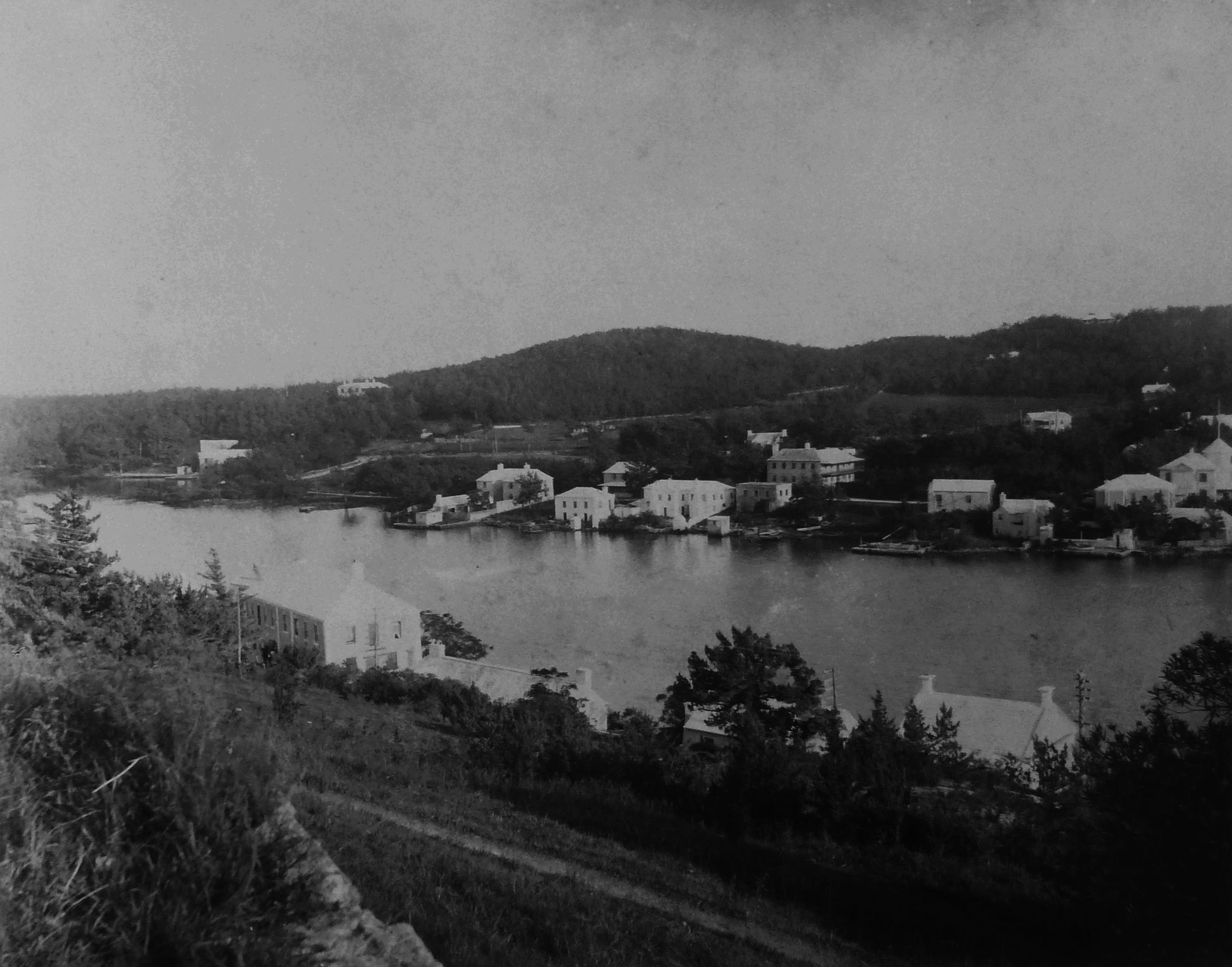
1904 view across Hamilton Harbour from Fort Hamilton of cedar-cloaked hills in Paget Parish

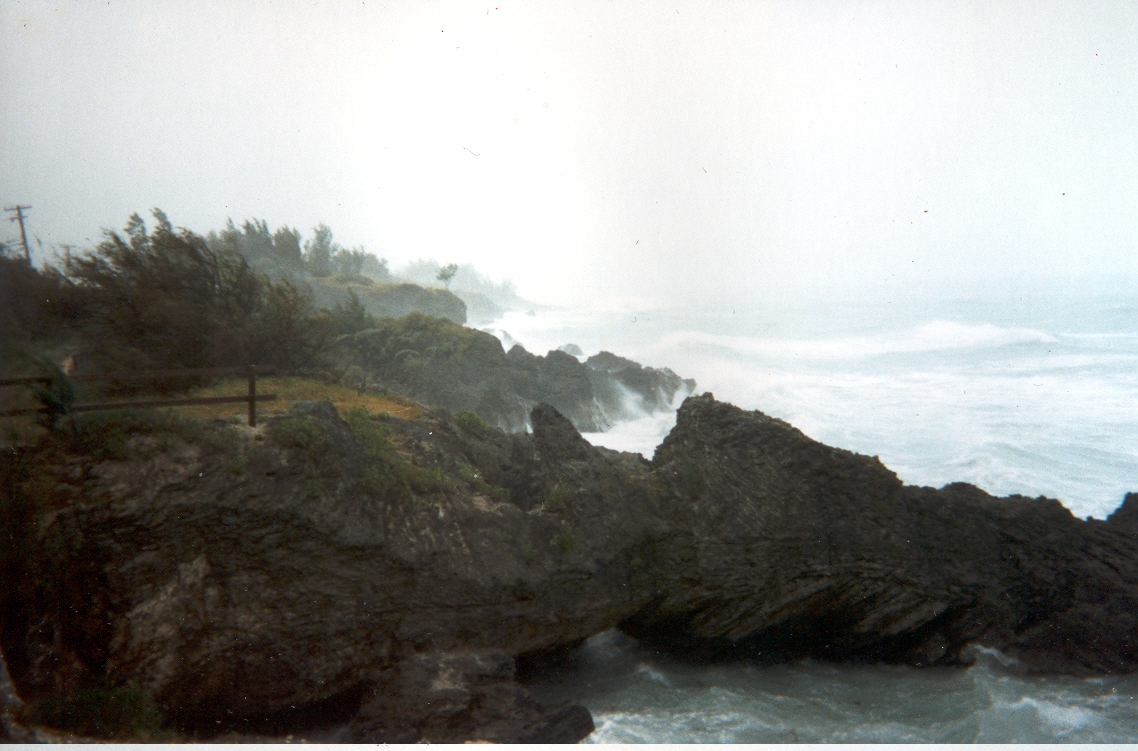
The coast of Callan Glen, Hamilton Parish, Bermuda.

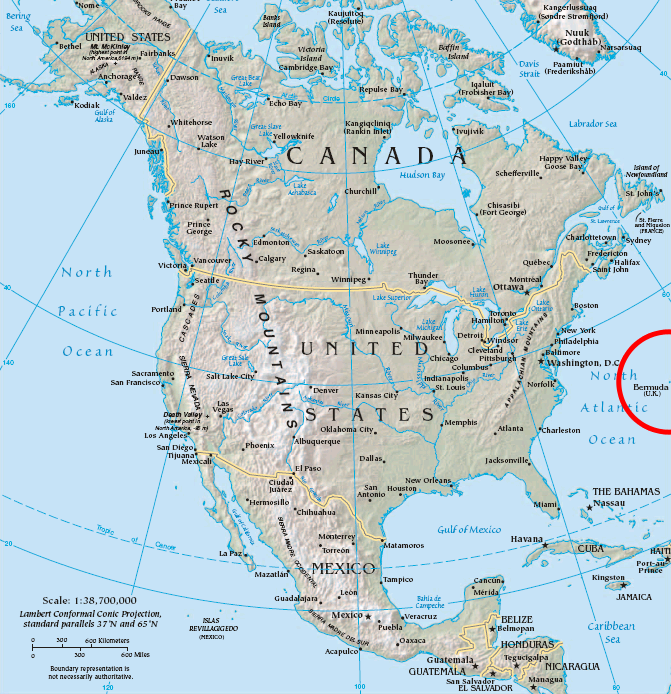
North America with Bermuda circled

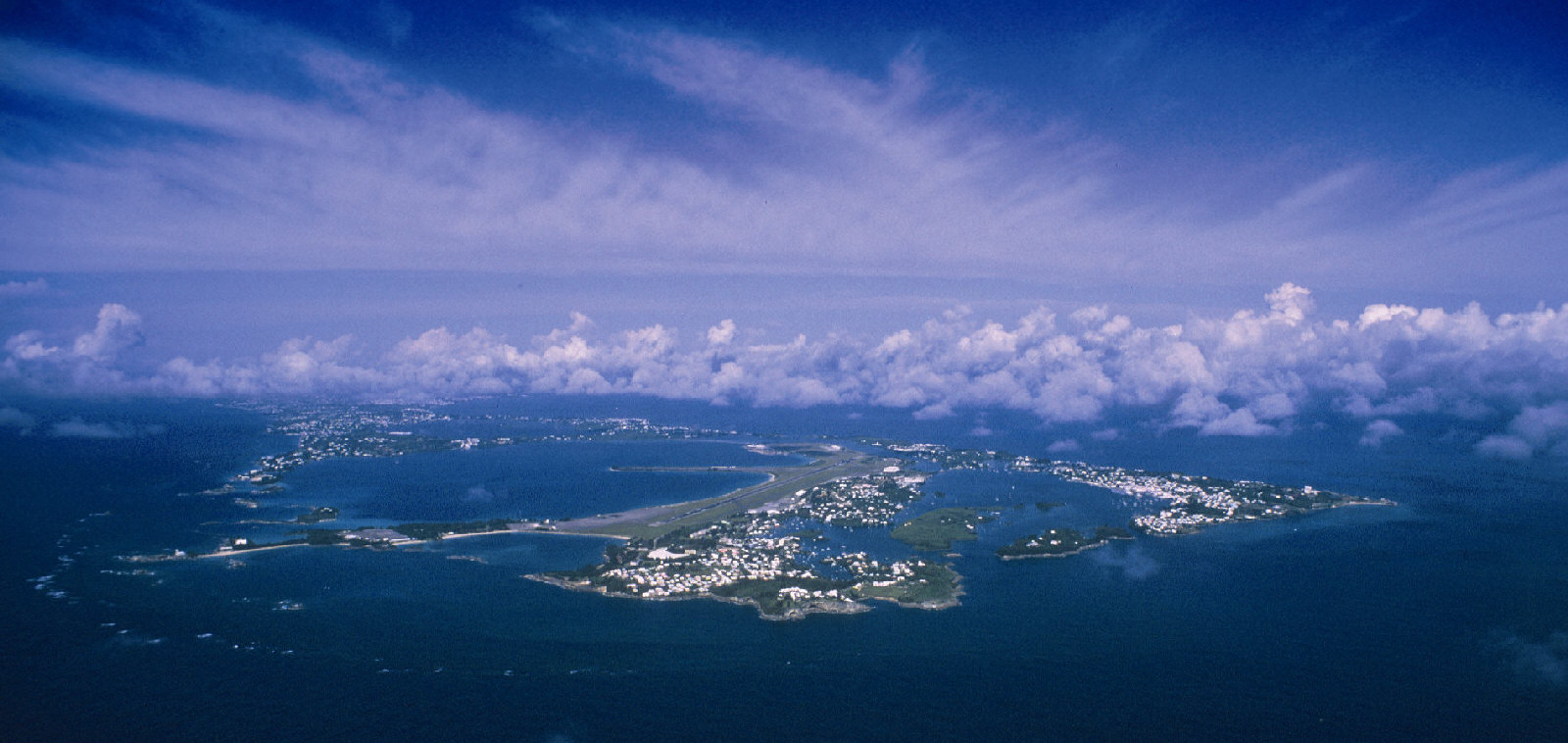
Aerial view of Bermuda looking west, St. David's and St. George's in foreground

Bermuda's ecology has been altered radically since the 16th century by humans and the plants and animals they introduced. Some species had actually become extinct long before this, including the short-tailed albatross, a species which occurs today only in the northern Pacific Ocean.

=== Flora ===
Forest cover is around 20% of the total land area, equivalent to 1,000 hectares (ha) of forest in 2020, which was unchanged from 1990. Of 165 plant species found in Bermuda today, 14 are endemic, and 25 are endangered.

When discovered, about 1505, the island's habitat was dominated by the remnant, old-growth forest of Bermuda juniper (Juniperus bermudiana). Underwater archaeology of the caldera basin to the north shows that the area was once densely forested with junipers when it was above sea level. The juniper is an endemic species, though related to species found in North America. Its wood is an unusually deep red, indicative of the high iron content of the island's soil (which is similarly very red). Prior to human settlement, there were several million juniper trees in Bermuda.

By the 1830s, large areas of Bermuda had been denuded by the shipbuilding industry. As that industry died out in the 19th century, however, the junipers rapidly recovered their numbers. By 1900, when the human population neared 20,000, the islands were again covered densely with juniper, although many of these were juvenile trees. The respite proved temporary, however.

In the 1940s, it was realised that two species of scale insect, Lepidosaphes newsteadi and Carulaspis minima, had accidentally been introduced, and were rapidly killing off the junipers, which had no immunity to their toxicological effect. Attempts were made to control the infestation naturally, which involved the large-scale introduction of ladybird beetles (Coccinellidae), but these were to no avail. Over the next decade, roughly 8 million juniper trees were lost to the scales. Motor cars were legalised in Bermuda in 1948, as a result of changes wrought by World War II, and the resultant sprawl of the rapidly growing population (which had reached 60,000 by the 1980s) outward from the pre-war population centres happened simultaneously with the destruction of the forests. Unlike in the 19th century, many plant species that had been introduced, some, like the Casuarina, specifically to replace the windbreak lost with the juniper, spread virulently. The juniper grows slowly by comparison to many of the introduced species, and has been unable to thrive in the presence of Casuarina and Brazilian pepper trees. Efforts to restore it centre around intensively managed land areas, such as gardens and golf courses. Other large plant species, which were never as numerous as the juniper, had also fared poorly in the presence of invasive species, but have become popular with gardeners and their numbers also have increased in managed areas. These include two native species, the Bermuda olivewood (Elaeodendron laneanum), and the Bermuda palmetto (Sabal bermudana), the only native or endemic palm. In some coastal areas and inland marshes,

Bermuda is the most northerly point at which mangrove trees are found. Smaller plants include many ferns. Notable among these is the rare Bermuda cave fern (Ctenitis sloanei). An even rarer fern, Diplazium laffanianum, no longer survives in the wild. Another native plant is the iris Bermudiana (Sisyrinchium bermudiana). This was thought to be endemic, but also appears in two locations in Ireland. Many of the smaller endemic and native plants of Bermuda are rare and endangered, but others have survived and prospered. The common Bermuda grass is not actually Bermudian, but a Mediterranean import.

=== Fauna ===
There were few species of land animal in Bermuda before the arrival of humans. The only vertebrate species was the Bermuda skink, or rock lizard (Eumeces longirostris). These were quite numerous, but have become rare due to predation by introduced species, and, especially, the introduction of glass bottles, in which they easily become trapped. Unlike the introduced anoles, their feet are unable to adhere to glass. Their range had been largely reduced to small islands of Castle Harbour, but they have re-colonised the mainland, and their numbers are increasing.

The only other large land animals found on the island were crustaceans, notably two species of land crab, including the rare giant land crab (Cardisoma quantami). Insects included the endemic, ground-burrowing solitary bee, which has not been observed for several decades and is believed extinct. The native cicada also became extinct with the loss of the juniper forest. Other native insects survive, including the migratory monarch butterfly (Danaus plexippus), which has become threatened due to the loss of milkweed, which has been eradicated as a weed.

The most numerous animals were, and are, birds. Several native species are related to North American species, including the eastern bluebird (Sialia sialis), and the white-eyed vireo (Vireo griseus bermudianus). Both of these were common, but have suffered from loss of habitat, from competition for nest sites with introduced house sparrows (Passer domesticus), and nest-predation by European starlings (Sturnus vulgaris) and great kiskadees (Pitangus sulphuratus) - this last species was deliberately introduced as late as 1957, with the intent that it would control the previously introduced anoles. Other native birds, including the grey catbird, have suffered from the same causes.

The most famous Bermudian bird is the endemic Bermuda petrel (Pterodroma cahow), or cahow. This is a pelagic seabird which had dug burrows for its nests. Humans are believed to have killed millions of them after settlement began in 1609, and feral pigs, introduced presumably by Spaniards decades before, also attacked their nests. Before the 17th century was over, the cahow was believed to be extinct. After sightings of the bird at sea, a young Bermudian, David B. Wingate, theorised cahows might still be nesting on rocky islets of Castle Harbour. He visited these islets with ornithologists Robert Cushman Murphy and Louis S. Mowbray in 1951 and discovered a handful of nesting pairs. Under Wingate's supervision, a conservation programme has steadily increased the cahow's numbers. Species that arrived by natural dispersion and become native after human settlement include the American barn owl (Tyto furcata), and the mourning dove (Zenaida macroura).

== Introduced flora and fauna ==
Since discovery by humans, numerous species have been introduced to the island, some deliberately, like the casurina, the feral pig, the cardinal (Cardinalis cardinalis), anoles, ladybird beetles, and the kiskadee, some incidentally, like the Norwegian rat (Rattus norvegicus) and the black rat (Rattus rattus), and the others accidentally, like the scale mites, and the brown widow spider (Latrodectus geometricus). Other imported species include the cane toad (Bufo marinus), and tree frogs.

In addition to casuarinas, numerous other species of tree, bush, shrub, cacti, palm, and other grasses have been introduced, with many of them proving to be invasive species. Despite the decimation of the cedar, those parts of the island not covered in buildings and tarmac are now densely covered in trees and shrubbery, including allspice (Pimenta dioica ), fiddlewood, Norfolk Island pine (Araucaria heterophylla), bay grape (Coccoloba uvifera), Surinam cherry (Eugenia uniflora), poinciana (Delonix regia), fan palms, coconut palm (Cocos nucifera), royal palm (Roystonea), pittusporum, Natal plum, loquat (Eriobotrya japonica), oleander (Nerium oleander), and hibiscus. Most of the introduced species have proved to be unequal to Bermuda's frequently fierce weather. A succession of winter storms and a few powerful hurricanes that have struck over the last two decades have reduced woodlands, and available nest sites for small birds. The number of large trees, particularly, has been reduced. Although cedars are adapted to the local climate, and not so affected by stormy weather, rising sea levels are beginning to inundate the roots of old-growth cedars near low-lying marshlands, causing many to die.

Many domestic animal species have been introduced, including dogs, horses, goats, sheep, chickens, and cats, with cats long having established a large feral population. Feral chickens have recently become numerous (since the government ended its policy of allowing members of the local shotgun club to shoot them), and feral rabbits can also be found. Populations of feral guinea pigs have been established and then eradicated. Feral pigs were hunted to extinction centuries ago. Today, introduced feral species, particularly cats, are blamed for falling numbers of native birds, from bluebirds to longtails, but the primary threats are loss of habitat, due now to overdevelopment, and climate change (rising sea levels, increased hurricane activity, and rising temperatures are all having an effect on cahow nests, particularly).

== Climate ==
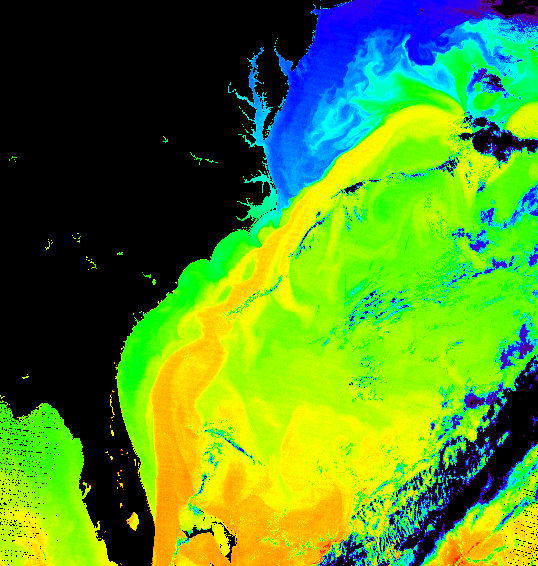
Bermuda's climate is partly determined by its location to the east of the warm, poleward-moving Gulf Stream.

Bermuda has a tropical rainforest climate (Köppen climate classification: Af). It's the territory with tropical climate at the highest latitude in the world. Bermuda's oceanic influence results in a more moderate climate, more similar to the western coast of Europe than on the eastern coast of North America, characterised by high relative humidity, which moderates temperature, ensuring generally mild winters and summers (by example, Glasgow, Scotland, at 55°51′40″ North, has an average winter temperature around 3 °Celsius, with temperatures as low as -8 °Celsius possible in December - its coldest month, while at about the same latitude, on the coast of Labrador, winter temperatures average −12 °Celsius, and can drop as low as -35 °Celsius. Lisbon, Portugal, and Princeton, New Jersey, at similar latitudes, have daily means in January of 11.8 °Celsius and −0.4 °Celsius, respectively).

Like western Europe, Bermuda is down wind of, and warmed by, the nearby Gulf Stream, with ocean temperatures warmer in winter than air temperatures, and heat radiated from the ocean into the atmosphere keeping air temperatures above freezing (this effect is more marked on the coastal areas, with lower elevations of inland valleys, such as Paget Marsh and Devonshire Marsh, often being distinctly cooler). The lowest temperatures are generally in February and March, not December and January, as the humidity generally causes a two-month lag between the winter solstice and the coldest point of the year (and also between the summer solstice and the warmest time of the year, July/August). January to March [average 18 °C (64 °F)]. Pre-industrial temperatures at Bermuda, as globally, were lower than temperatures over the last century and a half, with Little Ice Ages that began about 1650, 1770, and 1850. Temperatures low enough for ice to form at ground level have not been recorded since the 19th Century (climate data for the first three centuries of Bermuda's settlement is not included in the dataset from which historical high or low temperatures for Bermuda are usually given, with the lowest temperature "since records began" consequently being 43.3 °Celsius recorded on 26 February, 1993, although the Royal Engineers kept detailed records of local weather for much of the 19th Century, which show a low of 34.0 °Celsius on the 26 February, 1880, at the City of Hamilton). Although precipitation at altitude does include snow, Bermuda's highest elevation is only 79 metres (259 ft) above sea level (at Town Hill), and snow always melts to become rain before it reaches ground level, unless circulating before falling as hail, which is common in winter (and has fallen thickly enough to form blankets over parts of the island that melt more slowly than snow would, as with the hail that fell on 26 February, 1986). The hardiness zone is 11b/12a. In other words, the lowest that the annual minimum temperature may be expected to be is around 10 °C (50 °F). This is high for such a latitude and is a half-zone higher than the upper Florida Keys and Miami. Wind chill at Bermuda can be considerable, and can put the felt temperature below freezing even when the ambient temperature is well above.

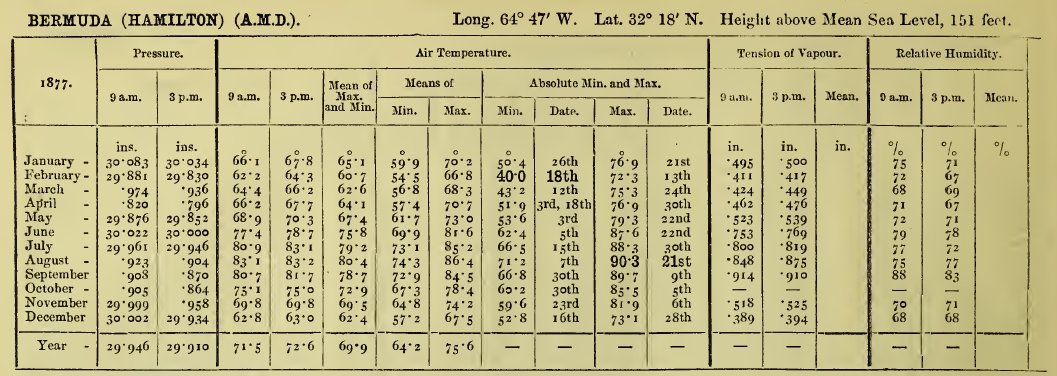
1877 Bermuda weather

Bermuda experiences hot and humid summers (mid-summer high temperatures generally reach as high a 86 °F (30 °C), although approaching hurricanes can push hot air from more southerly latitudes ahead of them, causing unusually high temperatures at Bermuda. The record high of 93 °F (34 °C) occurred during the month of August, 1989, when Hurricane Dean drove hot air northward to Bermuda) with the majority of precipitation falling from isolated showers and thunderstorms, and mild winters. Occasional Tropical Waves and Tropical Cyclones can also play a role in summertime precipitation totals when they exit the tropics. Winters are mild to semi-warm, with temperatures rarely falling below 10 °C (50 °F). Precipitation in wintertime is controlled by fronts moving eastward from the North American continent and into the Atlantic Ocean. During the peak of winter in Bermuda, these fronts can be followed by northwesterly gales and gusty showers that sometimes contain small hail. Precipitation is fairly evenly distributed through the year, but is somewhat less reliable in April and especially May, Bermuda's driest months on average, when the Bermuda-Azores High can bring extended dry spells. Summers are hot and humid, with frequent intense (but brief) thundershowers. On average, August is the wettest month. It is not uncommon, during the summer, to ride on sunbaked roads, then round a corner to come suddenly on drenched and steaming tarmac where a shower has passed only minutes earlier.

Bermuda's weather is largely controlled by the position and structure of the Bermuda-Azores High. This semi-permanent high pressure area (often centered southwest of the Azores) extends a ridge westward toward Bermuda during the spring and summer when the high is most intense. Oriented west-to-east to the near south of Bermuda, clockwise flow around the surface high brings prevailing winds from the southwest for much of the summer and subsequently prevents fronts from reaching the island. However, the ridge sometimes shifts to the north of the island allowing easterly or northeasterly winds. In fall and winter, the ridge near Bermuda becomes more transient, allowing frontal systems to affect the island. Winds around these systems are much more variable (and often stronger) but typically settle out of the southwest ahead of a cold front and shift to the west or northwest behind a cold front.

A local weather phenomenon that occurs mainly in late summer is colloquially known as "Morgan's Cloud". On otherwise fair, hot summer days with light southwesterly winds, convective clouds can develop along the length of the island and blow to the northeast growing. In extreme cases, this cloud formation can develop into heavy showers and thunderstorms and it has been known to produce funnel clouds and waterspouts in the eastern parishes. This phenomenon also occurs in the less common northeasterly wind regime ("reverse" Morgan's Cloud) but its effects are felt in the western parishes. The key to Morgan's Cloud forming is light winds blowing along the length of the island which is often warmer than the surrounding waters on hot summer days. This organizes upward motions allowing this cloud formation to occur. Similar localized cloud development is observed in linear tropical and subtropical islands globally. Furthermore, showers following strong cold fronts in wintertime form in a similar manner to lake-effect snow. Cold air blowing over warm water decreases atmospheric stability, allowing convection to form and grow into showers.

The hardiness zone is 11B/12A. In other words, the coldest that the annual minimum temperature may be expected to be is between 50 and 55 °F (10 and 13 °C). This is unusual for such a northerly latitude, and is a half-zone higher than the lower Florida Keys.

Climate data for Bermuda (L.F. Wade International Airport) (1991-2020 normals, extremes 1949-2023) (Note: Mean monthly maxima and minima (i.e. the highest and lowest temperature readings during an entire month or year) calculated based on data at said location from 2006 to 2023.)
Month	Jan	Feb	Mar	Apr	May	Jun	Jul	Aug	Sep	Oct	Nov	Dec	Year
Record high °C (°F)	25.4 (77.7)	26.1 (79.0)	26.1 (79.0)	27.2 (81.0)	30.0 (86.0)	32.2 (90.0)	33.1 (91.6)	33.9 (93.0)	33.2 (91.8)	31.7 (89.0)	28.9 (84.0)	26.7 (80.0)	33.9 (93.0)
Mean maximum °C (°F)	23.4 (74.1)	23.1 (73.6)	23.5 (74.3)	24.4 (75.9)	26.5 (79.7)	29.1 (84.4)	30.7 (87.3)	31.2 (88.2)	30.6 (87.1)	28.9 (84.0)	26.3 (79.3)	24.5 (76.1)	31.3 (88.3)
Mean daily maximum °C (°F)	20.7 (69.3)	20.4 (68.7)	20.5 (68.9)	22.1 (71.8)	24.3 (75.7)	27.2 (81.0)	29.6 (85.3)	30.1 (86.2)	29.1 (84.4)	26.7 (80.1)	23.8 (74.8)	21.8 (71.2)	24.7 (76.5)
Daily mean °C (°F)	18.3 (64.9)	17.9 (64.2)	18.1 (64.6)	19.7 (67.5)	22.0 (71.6)	25.0 (77.0)	27.2 (81.0)	27.7 (81.9)	26.7 (80.1)	24.4 (75.9)	21.6 (70.9)	19.6 (67.3)	22.4 (72.3)
Mean daily minimum °C (°F)	15.9 (60.6)	15.4 (59.7)	15.6 (60.1)	17.3 (63.1)	19.8 (67.6)	22.7 (72.9)	24.9 (76.8)	25.2 (77.4)	24.4 (75.9)	22.2 (72.0)	19.3 (66.7)	17.3 (63.1)	20.0 (68.0)
Mean minimum °C (°F)	11.5 (52.7)	11.6 (52.9)	11.4 (52.5)	14.0 (57.2)	16.3 (61.3)	19.4 (66.9)	21.7 (71.1)	22.5 (72.5)	21.4 (70.5)	19.0 (66.2)	15.9 (60.6)	13.6 (56.5)	10.2 (50.4)
Record low °C (°F)	7.2 (45.0)	6.3 (43.3)	7.2 (45.0)	8.9 (48.0)	12.1 (53.8)	15.2 (59.4)	16.1 (61.0)	20.0 (68.0)	18.9 (66.0)	14.4 (58.0)	12.4 (54.3)	9.1 (48.4)	6.3 (43.3)
Average precipitation mm (inches)	127.6 (5.02)	123.6 (4.87)	118.9 (4.68)	86.8 (3.42)	94.6 (3.72)	110.2 (4.34)	116.2 (4.57)	165.2 (6.50)	145.2 (5.72)	149.1 (5.87)	111.6 (4.39)	104.8 (4.13)	1,453.8 (57.23)
Average precipitation days (≥ 1 mm)	13.8	12.6	12.2	8.9	7.8	9.9	10.7	13.2	11.6	12.1	11.8	11.7	136.3
Average relative humidity (%)	73	73	73	74	79	81	80	79	77	74	72	72	76
Average dew point °C (°F)	13.4 (56.1)	13.3 (55.9)	12.9 (55.2)	15.2 (59.4)	17.7 (63.9)	21.1 (70.0)	22.8 (73.0)	23.1 (73.6)	22.2 (72.0)	19.8 (67.6)	16.6 (61.9)	14.6 (58.3)	17.7 (63.9)
Mean monthly sunshine hours	143.2	147.6	189.7	231.9	255.9	255.6	284.6	272.7	221.8	198.3	168.0	146.6	2,515.9
Source: Bermuda Weather Service (mean max and min 2006-2023, humidity 1995-2010, dew point 2002-2018, sun 1999-2019)

Average sea temperature
Jan	Feb	Mar	Apr	May	Jun	Jul	Aug	Sep	Oct	Nov	Dec
19.2 °C (66.6 °F)	18.6 °C (65.5 °F)	18.5 °C (65.3 °F)	20.1 °C (68.2 °F)	22.4 °C (72.3 °F)	25.3 °C (77.5 °F)	27.7 °C (81.9 °F)	28.3 °C (82.9 °F)	27.4 °C (81.3 °F)	24.9 °C (76.8 °F)	22.4 °C (72.3 °F)	20.1 °C (68.2 °F)

== Human geography ==
=== The early colony ===
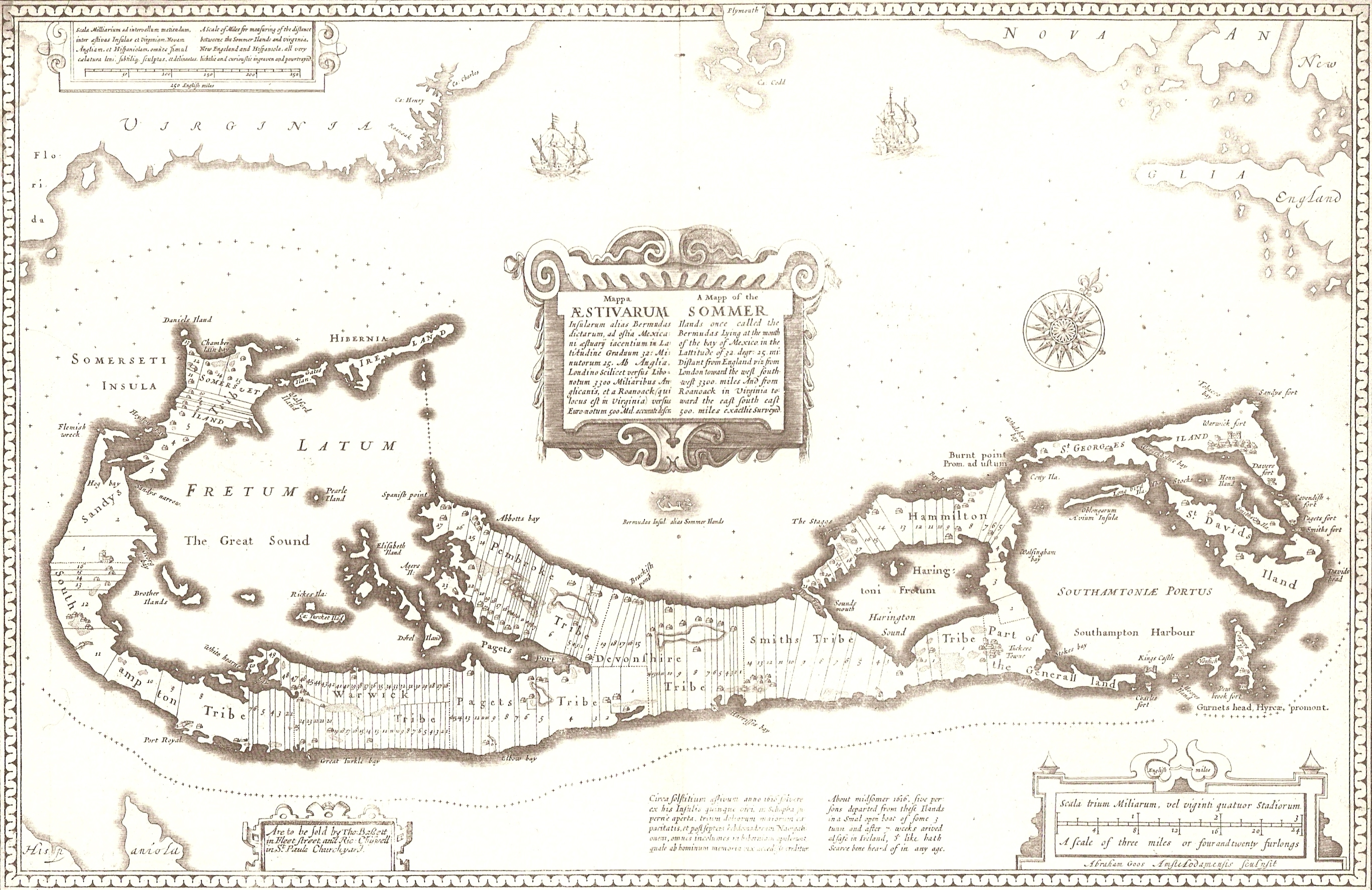
A 1676 map of the Somers Isles (Bermuda) by John Speed, based on the map of surveyor Richard Norwood

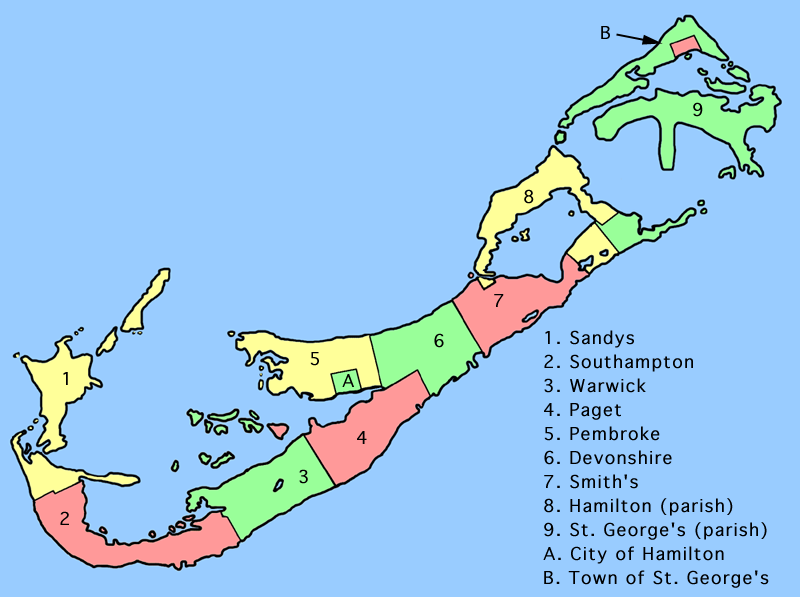
Subdivisions of Bermuda

When settled, in the 17th century, first by the Virginia Company, then by its spin-off, the Somers Isles Company, Bermuda was divided into nine equally sized administrative areas. These comprised one public territory (known as St. George's) and eight "tribes" (soon retitled as "parishes"). These "tribes" were subdivided into lots, separated by narrow tribe roads (supposedly created by clearing the path of a barrel rolled from the south to north shores). These roads served both to demarcate the boundaries of lots, and also as access routes to the shoreline, as the primary method of transport about Bermuda would remain by boat for the next three centuries. Each of the lots equated to shares in the company. Each of the tribes was named for a major "adventurer" (shareholder) of the company. Most were nobles, who used the toponyms of their titles, hence most of the parishes bear place names from England, Scotland, or Wales: Devonshire (for William Cavendish, 1st Earl of Devonshire, 1552–1626), Hamilton (for James Hamilton, 2nd Marquess of Hamilton, 1589–1625), Pembroke (for William Herbert, 3rd Earl of Pembroke, 1580–1630), Southampton (for Henry Wriothesley, 3rd Earl of Southampton, 1573–1624), and Warwick (for Robert Rich, 2nd Earl of Warwick, 1587–1658). The others are Paget (for William Paget, 4th Baron Paget de Beaudesert, 1572–1629), Sandys (for Sir Edwin Sandys, 1561–1629), and Smith's (for Sir Thomas Smith, 1588–1625). Hamilton Parish was originally named Bedford, after Lucy Russell, Countess of Bedford, who sold her shares to the Scottish nobleman, James Hamilton. Devonshire Parish had originally been named Cavendish Tribe. The short-lived use of the word "tribes" for administrative regions appears to have been unique to the Bermuda example. The ninth parish was common (or King's, or general) land, not subdivided by tribe roads, and was named for the patron saint of England, Saint George. It includes the island and the town both of the same name.

=== Nomenclature ===
Bermudian convention, where a toponym contains the name of a person, is to render the person's name in the possessive form. The place is rarely treated as equivalent to the person.

Among many examples of such place names in Bermuda are St. David's Island, Bailey's Bay, Sandys' Parish (named for Sir Edwin Sandys), Skeeters' Island (often mistakenly rendered "Skeeter's Island", it is named for Edward Skeeters and is also known as Burt's Island), Gibb's Hill, Barr's Bay, Ackermann's Hill, Nelly's Island, Cooper's Island, Darrell's Island, Paynter's Vale, Abbot's Head (or Abbot's Cliff), and Fort St. Catherine's. The possessive form is also used for titles, as with Collector's Hill (named for the Collector of Taxes).

The use of the possessive form is not exclusive, however, as exemplified by place names such as the names of most of the parishes (which - other than St. George's Parish - all commemorate historical people), such as Hamilton Parish (named for James Hamilton, 2nd Marquess of Hamilton), Devonshire Parish (named for), and Paget Parish. Some of these exceptions may have originated with changed syntax, as Devonshire Parish may originally have been The Parish of Devonshire. This is seen with the City of Hamilton (named for Henry Hamilton, a former Governor of Bermuda). Whereas the City of Hamilton is commonly referred to as Hamilton, The Town of St. George, St. George's Parish, St. George's Island, and St. George's Harbour (and any other toponym usually containing a person's name in the possessive form) always remains possessive when shortened, such as in the St. George's Foundation.

== Statistics ==
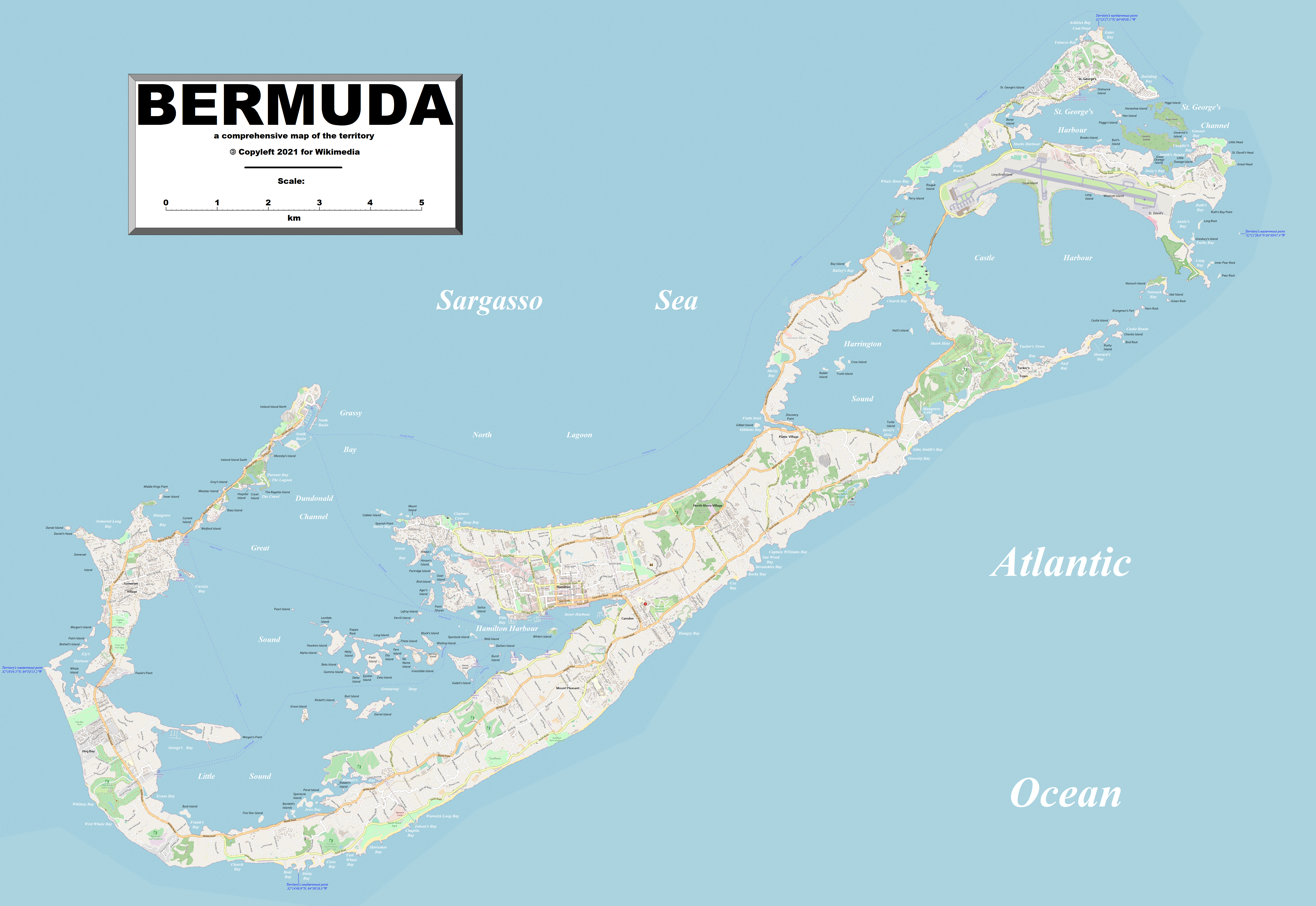
Enlargeable, detailed map of Bermuda

Maritime claims
- Territorial sea: 12 nmi (22.2 km; 13.8 mi)
- Exclusive fishing zone: 200 nmi (370.4 km; 230.2 mi)
Land use
- Arable land: 14.8%
- Permanent crops: 0%
- Other: 85.2% (55% developed, 45% rural/open space) (2012)
Natural hazards
Hurricanes (June to November)
Environment - current issues
sustainable development

== See also ==
- Bermuda § Parishes and municipalities
- List of islands of Bermuda
- Wildlife of Bermuda
- Bermuda Pedestal
- Tornadoes in Bermuda
- List of Bermuda hurricanes
