= Jackson Volcano =

Extinct volcano in Mississippi, USA

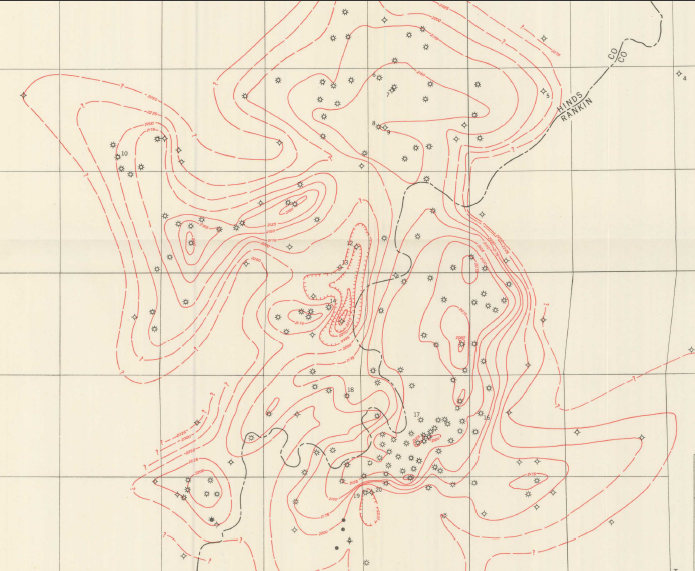
- Jackson structure contour map, top of the Clayton, with gas well locations

Highest point
- Elevation: 2,900 ft (880 m)below Jackson
- Coordinates: 32.300°N 90.172°W

Geography
- Location: Jackson, Mississippi

Geology
- Rock age: 66,000,000 years
- Mountain type(s): (unknown, extinct)
- Last eruption: Cretaceous

Jackson Volcano is an extinct volcano 2,900 feet (880 m) beneath the city of Jackson, Mississippi, under the Mississippi Coliseum. The uplifted terrain around the volcano forms the Jackson Dome, an area of dense rock clearly noticeable in local gravity measurements. E.W. Hilgard published his theory of an anticline beneath Jackson in 1860 due to his observations of surface strata. The dome contains relatively pure carbon dioxide which is used in oil production in Gulf Coast oil fields. The noble gas data suggests mantle origins with a date of 70 million years for the Jackson Dome intrusion. Geologists have evidence of repeated uplifts accompanied by dike intrusions and volcanic extrusions, erosion, and sedimentation with one coral reef having developed during a submergence. Much of the oil at the crest of the dome volatilized during a late uplift, but oil production wells numbered over a hundred in 1934.

Jackson Volcano is believed to have been extinct for at least 66 million years. A hypothesis states that the Jackson Volcano and related igneous activity in Mississippi were a result of the North America Plate's passage over the Bermuda hotspot 66 million years ago. Alternatively, the volcanism may have been part of a worldwide eruption driven by superplumes, similar to the conditions that created the Deccan Traps and the Siberian Traps.

The volcano is one of four total located inside cities in the United States, with Diamond Head in Honolulu, Hawaii, Pilot Butte in Bend, Oregon, and Mount Tabor in Portland, Oregon being the others. The volcano was discovered in 1819.

== Geology ==
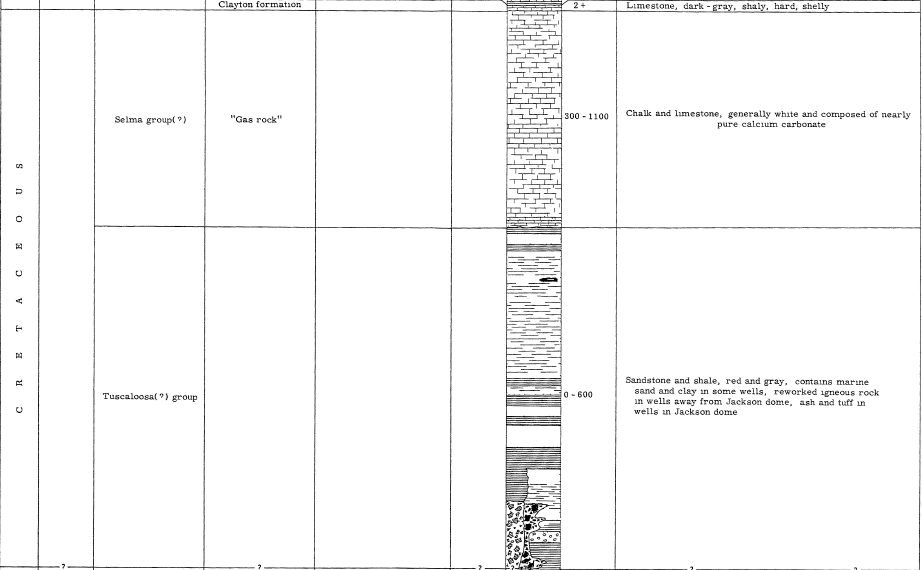
Jackson stratigraphic column

During the Late Cretaceous, the Western Interior Seaway extended into present-day Mississippi forming the Mississippi embayment and depositing the Tuscaloosa Formation. Igneous activity progressed along an arc in the northern Gulf of Mexico Basin starting with the Prairie Creek lamproite (110 Ma) in the west to the Magnet Cove (105 Ma), Granite Mountain (90 Ma), Monroe-Sharkey Uplift with its Midnight Volcano (80 Ma), and finally the Jackson Dome (70 Ma) in the east. The Jackson intrusion metamorphosed the Cotton Valley formation and deformed it into a dome structure. Thus, the Tuscaloosa consists of ash and tuff at the dome and eroded igneous rock away from the dome. Volcanic material is also found in the overlying Eutaw Formation. Subsidence and sea level rise resulted in the deposition of the chalk and limestone of the Selma Group. Natural gas accumulated in the Selma "gas rock" limestone underlying the Clayton limestone. The structure was noticed by Hopkins in 1917 and a successful gas well was drilled in 1930, but the field was nearly exhausted by 1939. Jackson Volcano ash within the Eutaw Formation produces oil in the Tinsley Oil Field, where oil was first discovered in the Woodruff Sandstone (Selma Chalk), an eroded sand from Jackson.
