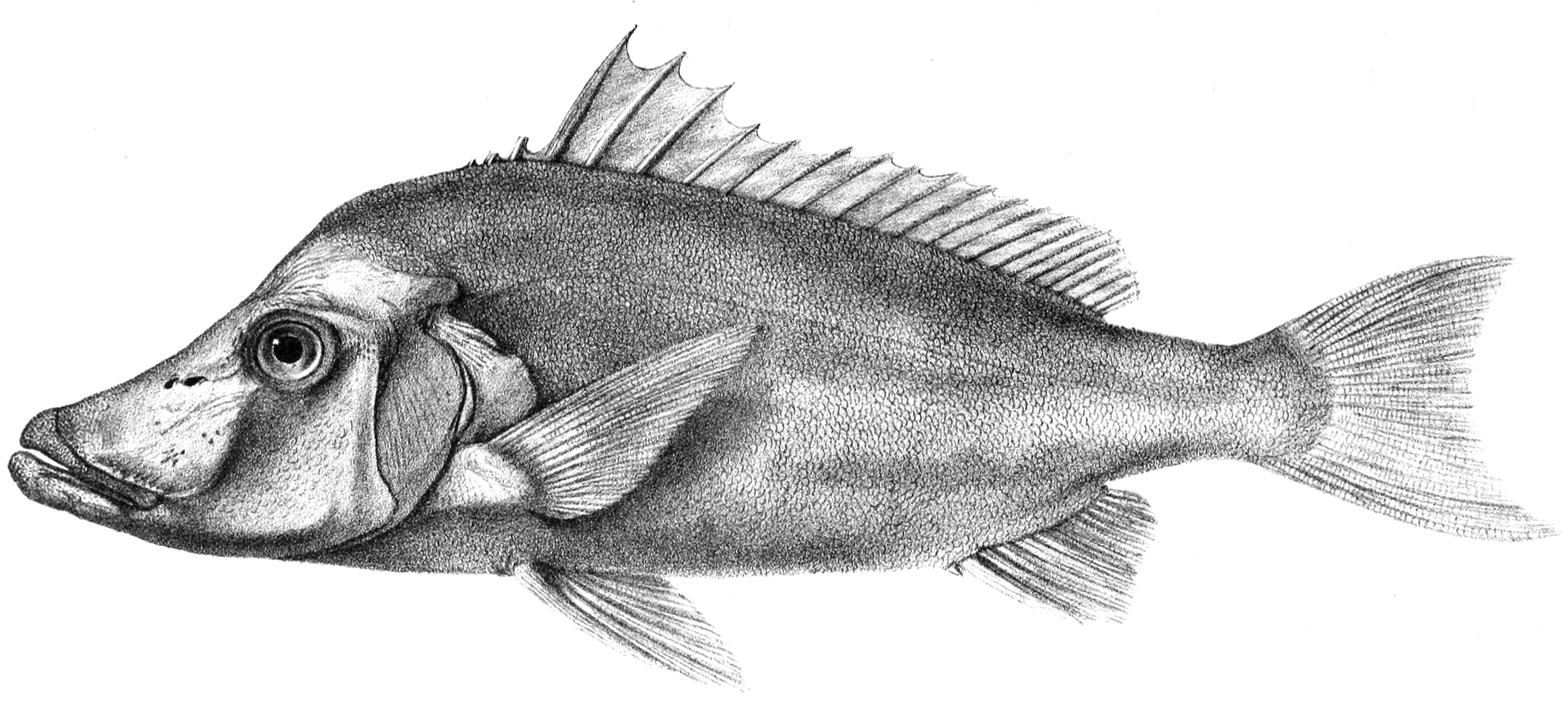

Scientific classification
- Domain: Eukaryota
- Kingdom: Animalia
- Phylum: Chordata
- Class: Actinopterygii
- Order: Acropomatiformes
- Family: Pentacerotidae
- Genus: Paristiopterus
- Species: P. labiosus

Binomial name
- Paristiopterus labiosus (Günther, 1872)

Synonyms
- Histiopterus labiosus Günther, 1872

= Paristiopterus labiosus =

Giant boarfish

Species of ray-finned fish

Paristiopterus labiosus, the giant boarfish, is a species of armorhead native to the coastal waters of southern Australia, and New Zealand. It occurs over the continental shelf at depths from 20 to 200 m (66 to 656 ft). This species can reach a length of 100 cm (39 in). It is a commercially important species.
