= Muir Seamount =

Underwater volcano on the Bermuda rise in the Atlantic

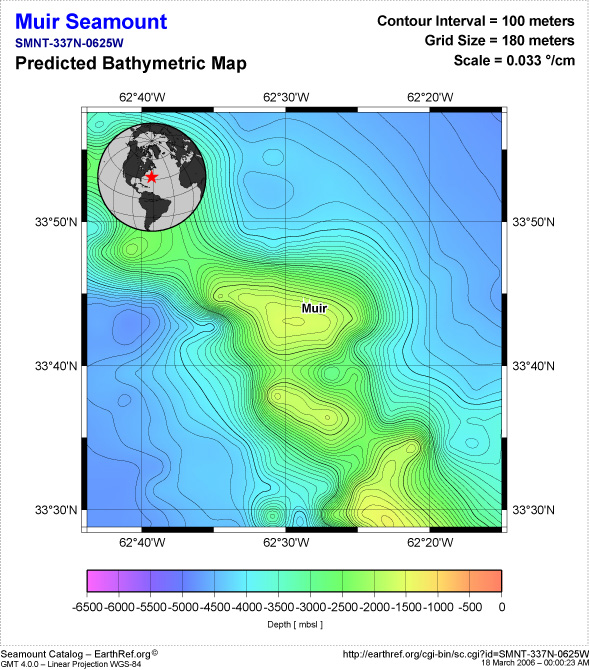
- Bathymetric map

- Location within Atlantic Ocean

Location
- Location: Mid-Atlantic, north of Bermuda
- Coordinates: 33°43.20′N 62°29.40′W

Geology
- Type: Seamount (Submarine volcano)
- Volcanic arc/chain: Bermuda rise

Muir Seamount is a seamount (underwater volcano), located at 33°43.20′N 62°29.40′W. It is located in the Bermuda rise, a seismically active region, and was the site of an earthquake on 24 March 1978.

Fourteen core samples of up to 125,000 years of age were collected off of Muir Seamount, ranging in depth to more than 3,000 m (9,843 ft). These samples were used to analyse the weight percentage of carbonate over time on the ocean floor, which in turn would provide clues to the oceanic environment over time. Overall concentrations were most stable at 4,650 m (15,256 ft) of depth. This was interpreted as indicating an increase in flow from the colder waters of the Antarctic, and the stagnation of the North American flows. A total of 8 core samples have been gathered, with ages ranging from Pliocene to Late Cretaceous. No radiometric dates are available for the seamount, but it may of Early Cretaceous time.

Over 150 invertebrates have been collected in total from Bear, Manning, and Muir seamounts. Ophiuroids and goose barnacles are the most abundant animal found on the seamount, as is Asteroshchema sp., a basket star. Paragorgia have also been observed. Genetic tests on the specimens collected indicated that Muir Seamount is the most genetically isolated of the four.

The Muir Seamount is the setting for the science fiction film The Neptune Factor in which an earthquake dislodges an undersea base into an adjacent trench.
