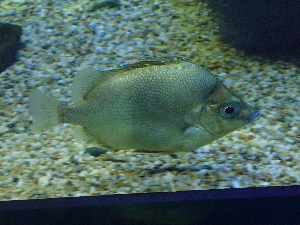
- Pentaceros japonicus Japan, Osaka Aquarium 12-2-2015 18cm

Conservation status
- Least Concern (IUCN 3.1)

Scientific classification
- Kingdom: Animalia
- Phylum: Chordata
- Class: Actinopterygii
- Order: Acropomatiformes
- Family: Pentacerotidae
- Genus: Pentaceros
- Species: P. japonicus

Binomial name
- Pentaceros japonicus Steindachner, 1883

= Pentaceros japonicus =

Species of ray-finned fish

Pentaceros japonicus, the Japanese armorhead or Japanese boarfish, is a species of armorhead native to the western Pacific Ocean from southern Japan south to New Zealand and Australia. It occurs at depths from 100 to 830 m (330 to 2,720 ft). It can reach a length of 25 cm (9.8 in). It is a commercially important species and can be found in the aquarium trade.
