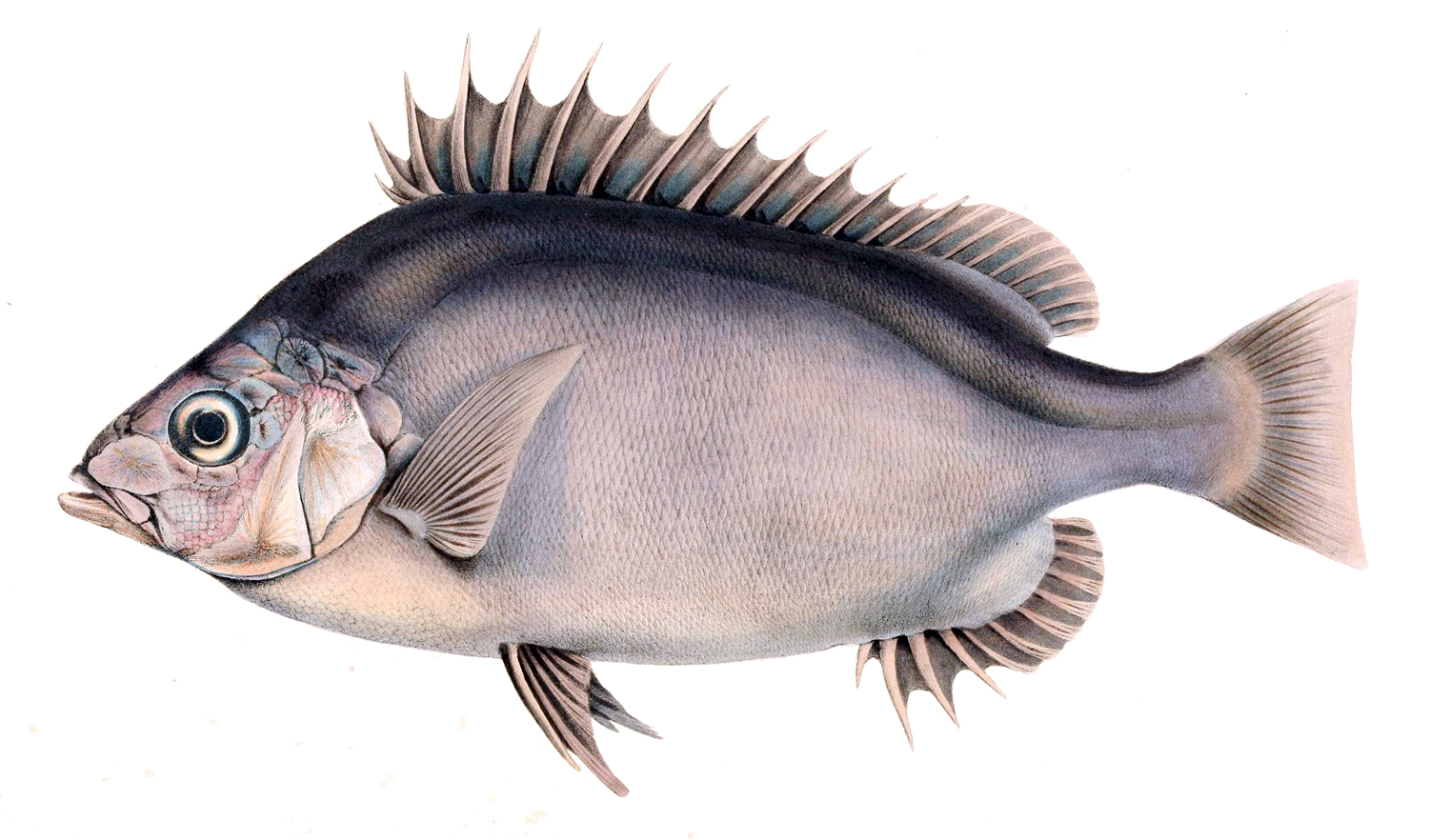

Scientific classification
- Kingdom: Animalia
- Phylum: Chordata
- Class: Actinopterygii
- Order: Acropomatiformes
- Family: Pentacerotidae
- Genus: Pentaceros
- Species: P. richardsoni

Binomial name
- Pentaceros richardsoni A. Smith, 1844

Synonyms
- Pseudopentaceros richardsoni (A. Smith, 1844); Pentaceros knerii Steindachner, 1866; Griffinetta nelsonensis Whitley & Phillipps, 1939

= Pentaceros richardsoni =

Species of fish

Pentaceros richardsoni, the pelagic armourhead, Richardson's boarfish or southern boarfish, is a species of marine ray-finned fish, an armourhead from the family Pentacerotidae. It has a wide distribution in the oceans of the southern hemisphere. It is commercially important as a food fish.

== Description ==
Pentaceros richardsoni is a large armourhead with quite a large head and a moderately deep body which is laterally compressed and slightly rounded. The head is largely covered in finely marked bones which are rough to the touch. It has a straight snout which becomes rounded and bulbous in mature adults. The small mouth is slightly angled upwards and has jaws armed with narrow bands of short, moderately curved teeth and there are teeth on the roof of the mouth. The body is covered on small, ctenoid rough scales which form small polygonal plates which interlock on the throat and abdomen. The lateral line is high up on the flanks and its for parallels the dorsal profile. The dorsal fin contains 14–15 spines and 8–9 soft rays and is continuous and long based. The spines at the head end increases in length and thickness with the fourth spine being the longest and most robust, the spines the decrease in length and thickness. The soft rays are taller than the ultimate dorsal spines. The anal fin has a short base, sits opposite the soft part of the dorsal fin and is similar in form to it, it has 4–5 spines and 8–9 soft rays. The caudal fin is a little bit emarginate. The colouration of this species is that it is iridescent dark blue dorsally and silvery-grey on the flanks and the underside. This species attains a maximum total length of 56 centimetres (22 in).

== Distribution ==
Pentaceros richardsoni is a species which is found around the globe in the temperate waters of the Oceans of the Southern Hemisphere. It has been recorded from southern Australia, New Zealand and Cape Horn in Chile in the Pacific, off eastern South Africa in the Indian Ocean and the Western Cape and Tristan da Cunha in the Atlantic Ocean. Records from the North Pacific refer to another species.

== Habitat and biology ==
Pentaceros richardsoni is a demersal species as an adult The adults can be found at depth while juveniles are found nearer the surface. They are frequently found in the vicinity of seamounts, ridges and rises. It has been found down to depths of 600 metres (2,000 ft).

== Taxonomy ==
Pentaceros richardsoni was first formally described in 1844 by the Scots surgeon, explorer, ethnologist and zoologist Andrew Smith (1797–1872) with the type locality given as Cape Point, South Africa. For a long time it was placed in the genus Pseudopentaceros but examination of skeletal and musculature has led to Pseudopentaceros being considered a junior synonym of Pentaceros. The specific name honours the naval surgeon, naturalist and arctic explorer Sir John Richardson.
