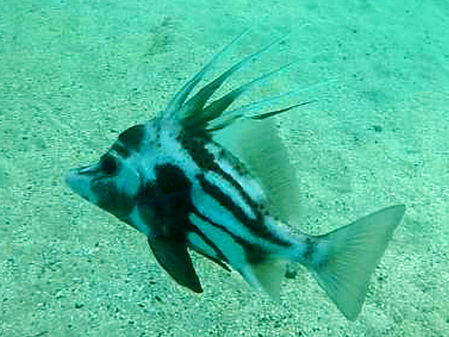

Scientific classification
- Kingdom: Animalia
- Phylum: Chordata
- Class: Actinopterygii
- Order: Acropomatiformes
- Family: Pentacerotidae
- Genus: Paristiopterus
- Species: P. gallipavo

Binomial name
- Paristiopterus gallipavo Whitley, 1944

= Paristiopterus gallipavo =

Species of ray-finned fish

Paristiopterus gallipavo, the yellowspotted boarfish, brown-spotted boarfish, giant boarfish or yellow-spotted penfish, is a species of marine ray-finned fish, an armourhead from the family Pentacerotidae. It is a carnivorous species which is endemic to the temperate seas of southern Australia where its range extends from Carnarvon, Western Australia to the Investigator Strait in South Australia. It is found at depths down to 260 metres (850 ft) and it lives on the continental shelf or continental slope.
