= Granite Mountain (Arkansas) =

Landform in Arkansas, United States

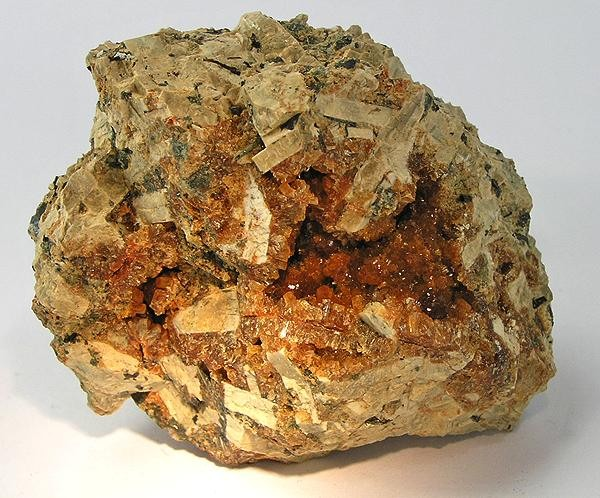
Orthoclase crystals with flecks of biotite in a shallow pocket with glittery crystals of transparent stilbite from the Granite Mountain area

Granite Mountain is an igneous intrusion southeast of Little Rock, Arkansas. Despite being named after granite, the rock at Granite Mountain is actually syenite, a rock that is visually similar to granite, but contains much less quartz. The rock was formed in the Cretaceous period around 90 million years ago, after the lamproites at Prairie Creek and the later Magnet Cove complex, and before the formation of the Monroe Uplift and Jackson Dome.
