= Bermuda Pedestal =

Geological feature in the North Atlantic Ocean

Coordinates: 32°20′N 64°45′W

The Bermuda Pedestal is an oval geological feature in the northern Atlantic Ocean containing the topographic highs of the Bermuda Platform, the Plantagenet (Argus) Bank, and the Challenger Bank. The pedestal is 50 km (31 mi) long and 25 km (16 mi) wide at the 100 fathom line (-185 m), while the base measures 130 km by 80 km at -4200 m. Surrounding the pedestal is a much larger mid-basin swell known as the Bermuda Rise, measuring 900 km by 600 km at the 5000 m depth contour. The islands of Bermuda are located on the southeastern margin of the Bermuda Pedestal.

The oceanic crust surrounding the Bermuda has an age of about 120 Ma, while the initial uplift of the Bermuda Rise occurred in the Middle to Late Eocene. Erosion continued from that time until the Early Oligocene. Volcaniclastic deposition and erosion ended with subsidence below sea level in the Late Oligocene. Volcanic basement is at a depth of 75 m across the platform, and 50 m on the island, except for a highpoint near Castle Harbour, at a depth of 15 m. These volcanics consist of tholeiitic lavas and intrusive lamprophyric sheets.

Scientists have long considered the Bermuda Pedestal to be the remains of a large extinct shield volcano that formed between 45 and 35 million years ago. A number of theories have been established to explain the origin of the Bermuda Pedestal. According to one of these theories, it was formed by the volcanic activity of the Bermuda hotspot. In contrast, Peter R. Vogt and Woo-Yeol Jung propose instead that the Bermuda Pedestal possibly formed as a result of a worldwide reorganization of the Earth's tectonic plates due to the closing of the Tethys Ocean when the Indian subcontinent collided with Eurasia.

The size of the Bermuda Pedestal combined with knowledge of other mid-ocean volcanoes (immediately north-eastward of the Bermuda Pedestal is the Bowditch Seamount and a scattering of other seamounts, including Nashville Seamount at the eastern end of the New England Seamounts, together forming the Bermuda-New England Seamount Arc) tells us that the Bermuda volcano originally reached 1,000 m (3,300 ft) above sea level and that it took three to ten million years to reduce it to sea level.

== See also ==
- Geography of Bermuda
- Bermuda hotspot
- List of shield volcanoes
