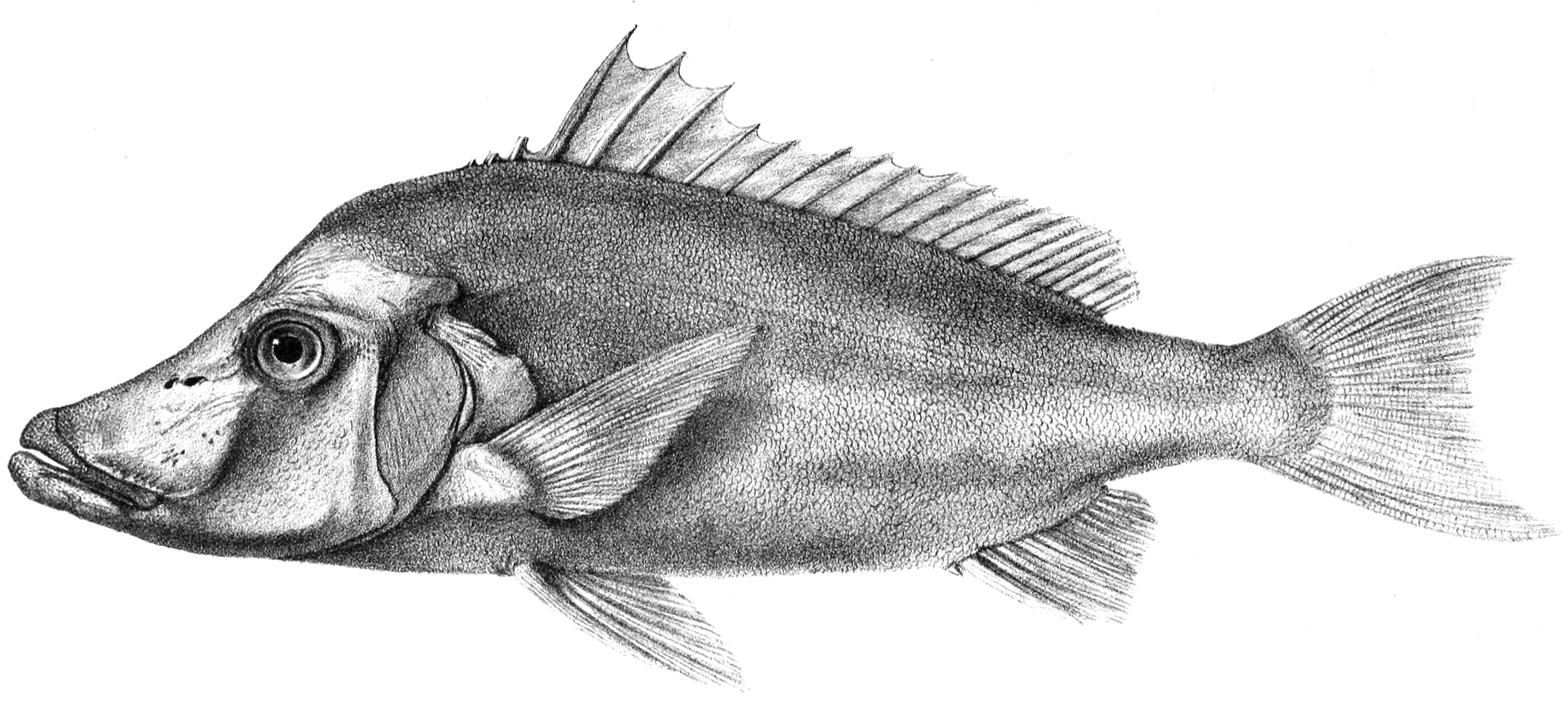
- Paristiopterus labiosus

Scientific classification
- Kingdom: Animalia
- Phylum: Chordata
- Class: Actinopterygii
- Division: Teleostei
- Order: Acropomatiformes
- Family: Pentacerotidae
- Subfamily: Histiopterinae
- Genus: Paristiopterus; Bleeker, 1876

Type species
- Richardsonia insignis Castelnau, 1872

Synonyms
- Glauertichthys Whitley, 1945; Macullochia Waite, 1910; Richardsonia Castelnau, 1872 (pre-occupied)

= Paristiopterus =

Genus of ray-finned fishes

Paristiopterus is a genus of armorheads native to the coasts of Australia and New Zealand, along with these recognized species:

- Paristiopterus gallipavo Whitley, 1944 (yellow-spotted boarfish)
- Paristiopterus labiosus (Günther, 1872) (giant boarfish)
