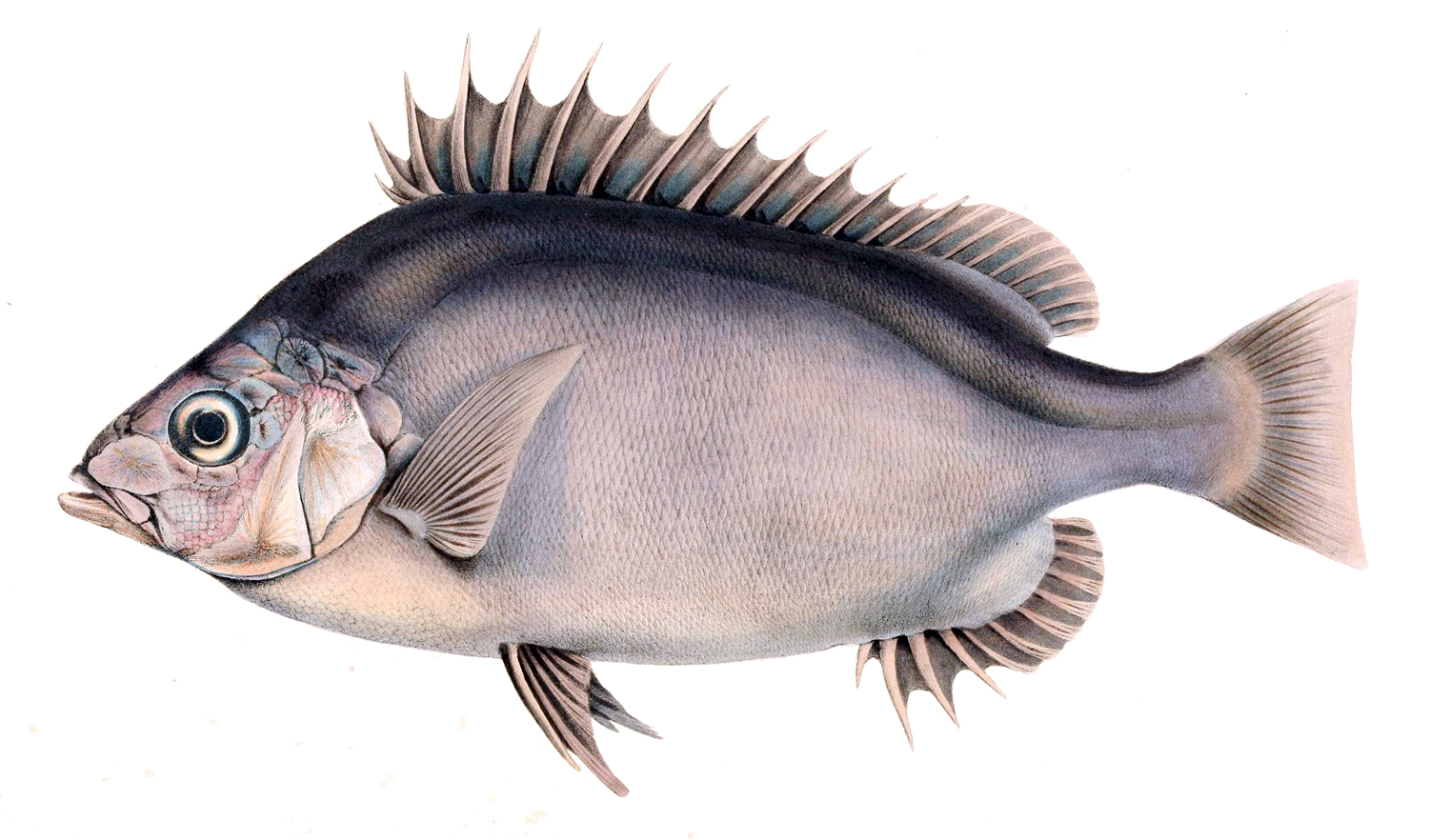
- Pentaceros richardsoni

Scientific classification
- Kingdom: Animalia
- Phylum: Chordata
- Class: Actinopterygii
- Order: Acropomatiformes
- Family: Pentacerotidae
- Subfamily: Pentacerotinae
- Genus: Pentaceros; G. Cuvier, 1829

Type species
- Pentaceros capensis G. Cuvier, 1829

Synonyms
- Pseudopentaceros Bleeker, 1876; Gilchristia D. S. Jordan, 1907; Quadrarius D. S. Jordan, 1907; Quinquarius D. S. Jordan, 1907; Undecimus Whitley, 1934; Griffinetta Whitley & Phillipps, 1939

= Pentaceros =

Genus of ray-finned fishes

Pentaceros is a genus of marine ray-finned fish, armorheads from the family Pentacerotidae. They are native to the Pacific, Indian, and eastern Atlantic Oceans. Pentaceros is the only genus in the monotypic subfamily Pentacerotinae.

== Species ==
The currently recognized species in this genus are:

- Pentaceros capensis G. Cuvier, 1829 (Cape armorhead)
- Pentaceros decacanthus Günther, 1859 (big-spined boarfish)
- Pentaceros japonicus Steindachner, 1883 (Japanese armorhead)
- Pentaceros quinquespinis Parin & Kotlyar, 1988
- Pentaceros richardsoni A. Smith, 1844 (pelagic armorhead)
- Pentaceros wheeleri (Hardy, 1983) (slender armorhead)
