= Pentaceros wheeleri =

Scientific classification
- Kingdom: Animalia
- Phylum: Chordata
- Class: Actinopterygii
- Order: Acropomatiformes
- Family: Pentacerotidae
- Genus: Pentaceros
- Species: P. wheeleri

Binomial name
- Pentaceros wheeleri Hardy, 1983

Species of ray-finned fish

Pentaceros wheeleri, the slender armorhead, is a species of ray-finned fish within the family Pentacerotidae. Observations based on the lack of individuals over 3 years of age in seamounts has suggested that P. wheeleri may only spawn in 1 to 2 seasons only to then die afterwards.

== Synonymised names ==
Placed by the World Register of Marine Species.

- Pentaceros pectoralis Hardy, 1983
- Pseudopentaceros pectoralis Hardy, 1983
- Pseudopentaceros wheeleri Hardy, 1983
