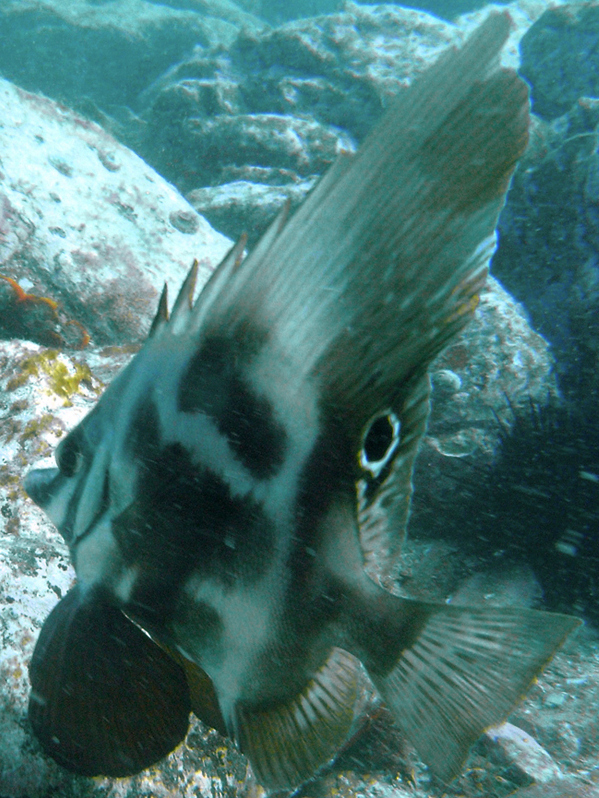

Scientific classification
- Kingdom: Animalia
- Phylum: Chordata
- Class: Actinopterygii
- Order: Acropomatiformes
- Family: Pentacerotidae
- Subfamily: Histiopterinae
- Genus: Parazanclistius; Hardy, 1983
- Species: P. hutchinsi

Binomial name
- Parazanclistius hutchinsi Hardy, 1983

= Short boarfish =

Species of ray-finned fish

The short boarfish (Parazanclistius hutchinsi), also known as Hutchin's boarfish, is a species of marine ray-finned fish, an armourhead from the family Pentacerotidae. It is endemic to the southern coast of Western Australia. It is found on the continental shelf at depths from 10 to 80 m (33 to 262 ft). This species grows to a total length of 34 centimetres (13 in), and is the only known member of its genus.
