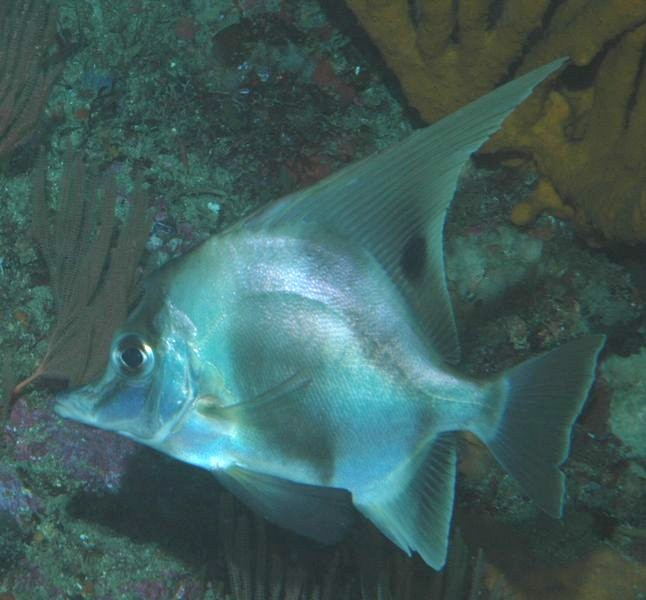

Scientific classification
- Kingdom: Animalia
- Phylum: Chordata
- Class: Actinopterygii
- Order: Acropomatiformes
- Family: Pentacerotidae
- Subfamily: Histiopterinae
- Genus: Zanclistius; D. S. Jordan, 1907
- Species: Z. elevatus

Binomial name
- Zanclistius elevatus (E. P. Ramsay & J. D. Ogilby, 1888)

Synonyms
- Histiopterus elevatus E. P. Ramsay & J. D. Ogilby, 1888

= Longfin boarfish =

Species of ray-finned fish

The longfin boarfish (Zanclistius elevatus), also known as the blackspot boarfish, is a species of marine ray-finned fish, an armourhead from the family Pentacerotidae which is native to the coasts of southern Australia, Tasmania and New Zealand. It can be found over the continental shelf and the continental slope at depths from 25 to 540 m (82 to 1,772 ft). This species can reach a length of 40 cm (16 in). It can also be found in the aquarium trade, and is currently the only known member of the genus Zanclistius.

== Appearance ==
the Blackspot Boarfish is a pale silvery-grey to yellowish-green fish, its body and head is covered in small scales except for is opercular bones, Blackspot Boarfish has a tall dorsal fin with a dark spot on the rear.

== Distribution ==
in Australia the Blackspot Boarfish is found from Cape Moreton in southern Queensland, to south of Dirk Hartog Island in Western Australia and is also found and around Tasmania. Elsewhere, the Blackspot Boarfish occurs in northern New Zealand waters. Most commonly it is found at depths of around 100 m, but it has been found at depths as low as 540 m.
