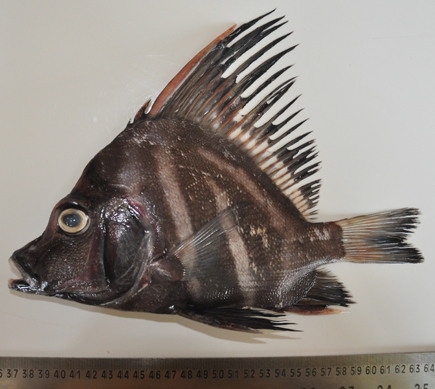

Conservation status
- Data Deficient (IUCN 3.1)

Scientific classification
- Kingdom: Animalia
- Phylum: Chordata
- Class: Actinopterygii
- Division: Teleostei
- Order: Acropomatiformes
- Family: Pentacerotidae
- Subfamily: Histiopterinae
- Genus: Histiopterus; Temminck & Schlegel, 1844
- Species: H. typus

Binomial name
- Histiopterus typus Temminck & Schlegel, 1844

Synonyms
- Histiopterus spinifer Gilchrist, 1904

= Sailfin armourhead =

Species of ray-finned fish

The sailfin armourhead (Histiopterus typus), also known as the threebar boarfish, is a species of marine ray-finned fish, an armourhead from the family Pentacerotidae which is native to the Indian Ocean and the western Pacific Ocean. It is an inhabitant of rocky reefs in deeper waters of 40 to 421 m (131 to 1,381 ft) in depth. This species grows to a length of 42 cm (17 in), though most are only around 20 cm (7.9 in). It is a commercially important species, and is the only known member of its genus.
