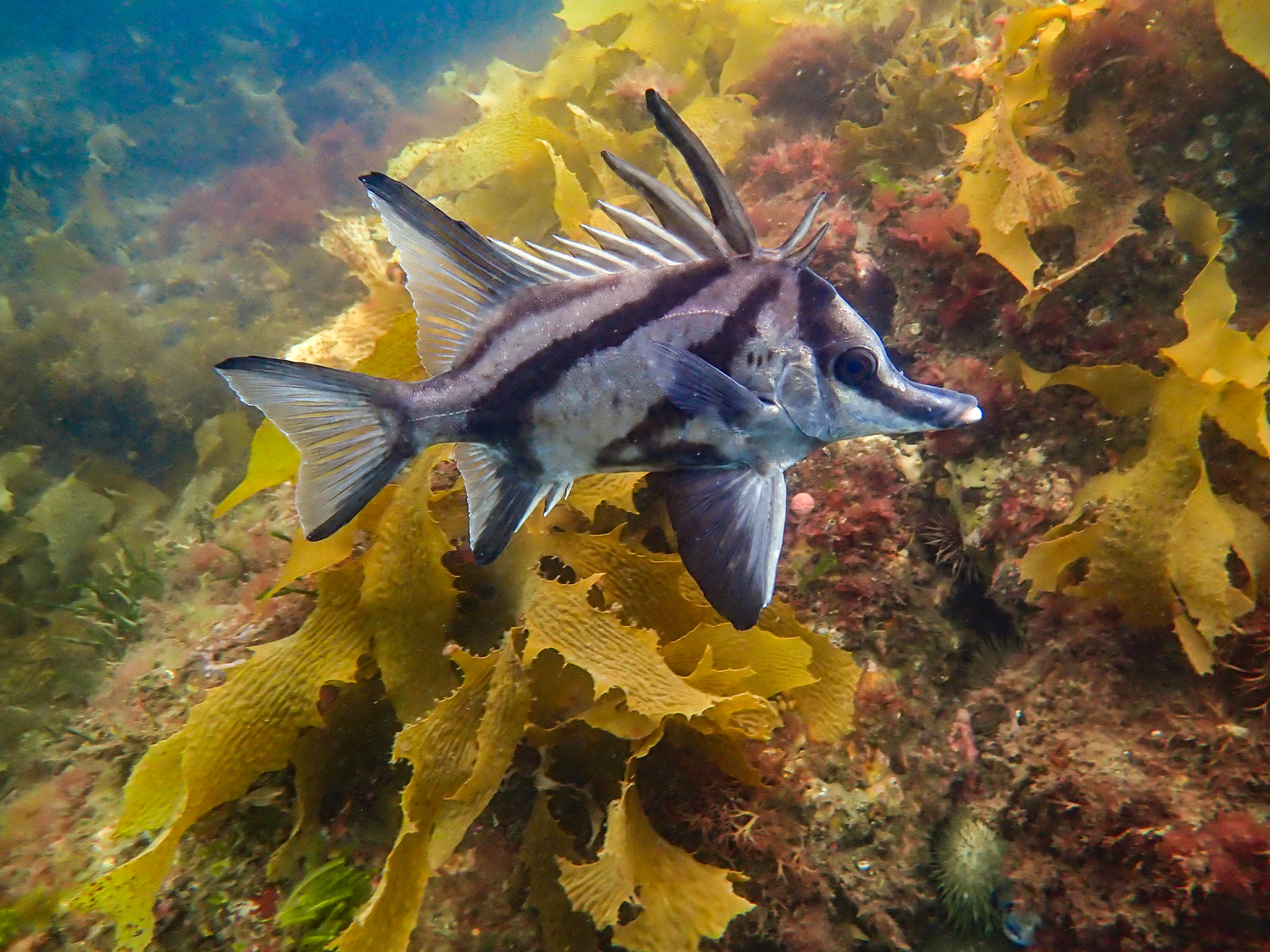
- In Tasmania

Scientific classification
- Kingdom: Animalia
- Phylum: Chordata
- Class: Actinopterygii
- Order: Acropomatiformes
- Family: Pentacerotidae
- Subfamily: Histiopterinae
- Genus: Pentaceropsis; Steindachner, 1883
- Species: P. recurvirostris

Binomial name
- Pentaceropsis recurvirostris (J. Richardson, 1845)

Synonyms
- For genus: Prosoplismus Waite, 1903; For species: Histiopterus recurvirostris J. Richardson, 1845

= Longsnout boarfish =

Species of ray-finned fish

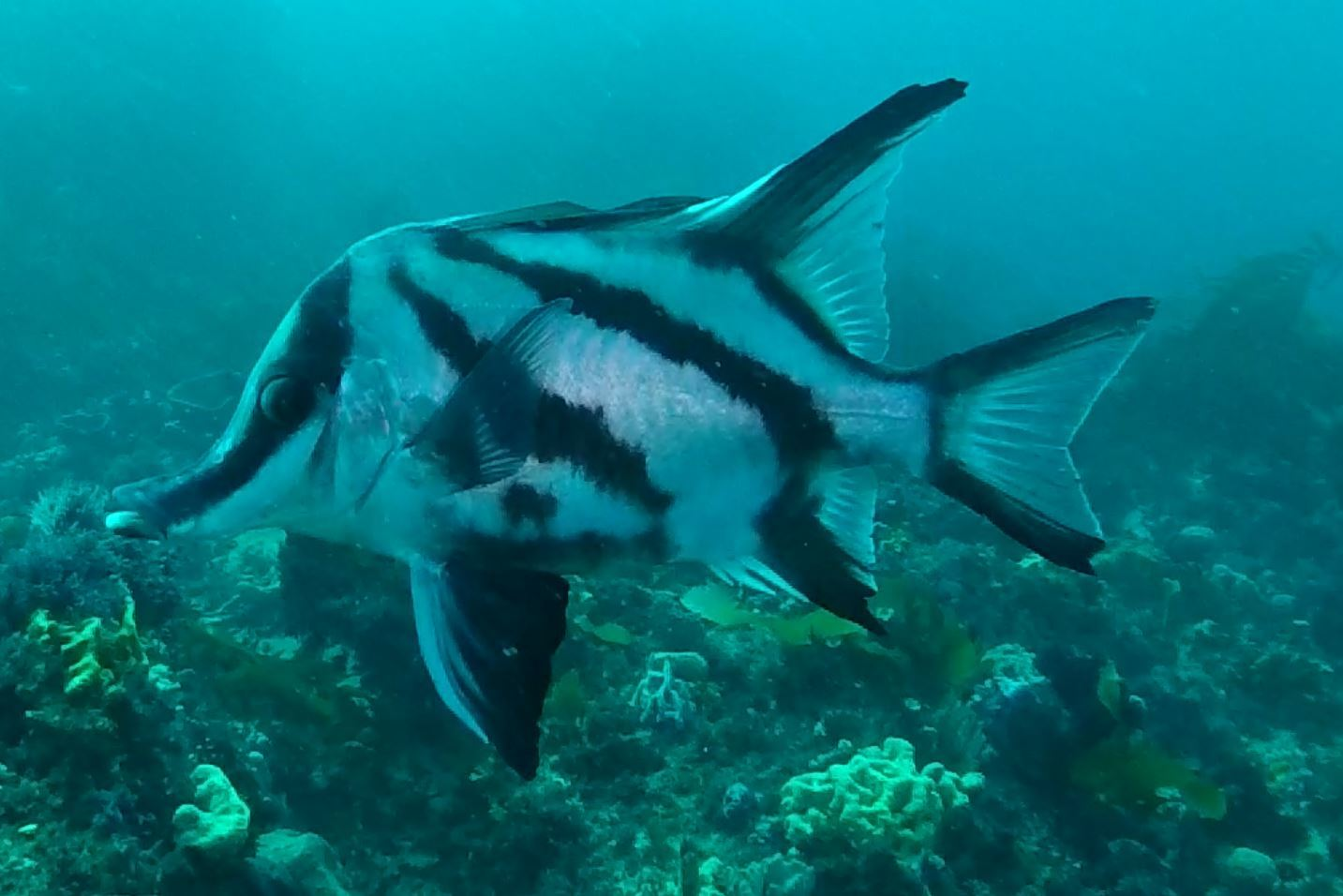
In Victoria (AU)

The longsnout boarfish (Pentaceropsis recurvirostris) is a species of marine ray-finned fish, an armourhead from the family Pentacerotidae. It is endemic to the temperate waters of the southern coast of Australia including around the island of Tasmania. It is found over the continental shelf at depths from 3 to 260 m (9.8 to 853.0 ft), though usually at less than 40 m (130 ft). It is carnivorous and its diet consists mostly of polychaete worms, brittle stars, and brown algae. It is trawled throughout its range, though is not a commercially important species and catch rates are low. It is the only known member of its genus.

== Morphology ==
The longsnout boarfish grows to a maximum length of 70 cm (28 in). It has a large, spiky dorsal fin with 10-11 spines and a slightly forked tail. Its snout is almost tubular with a small mouth. The fish is white in colour with two dark angled bands on both sides and another band running from the snout tip to dorsal fin.
