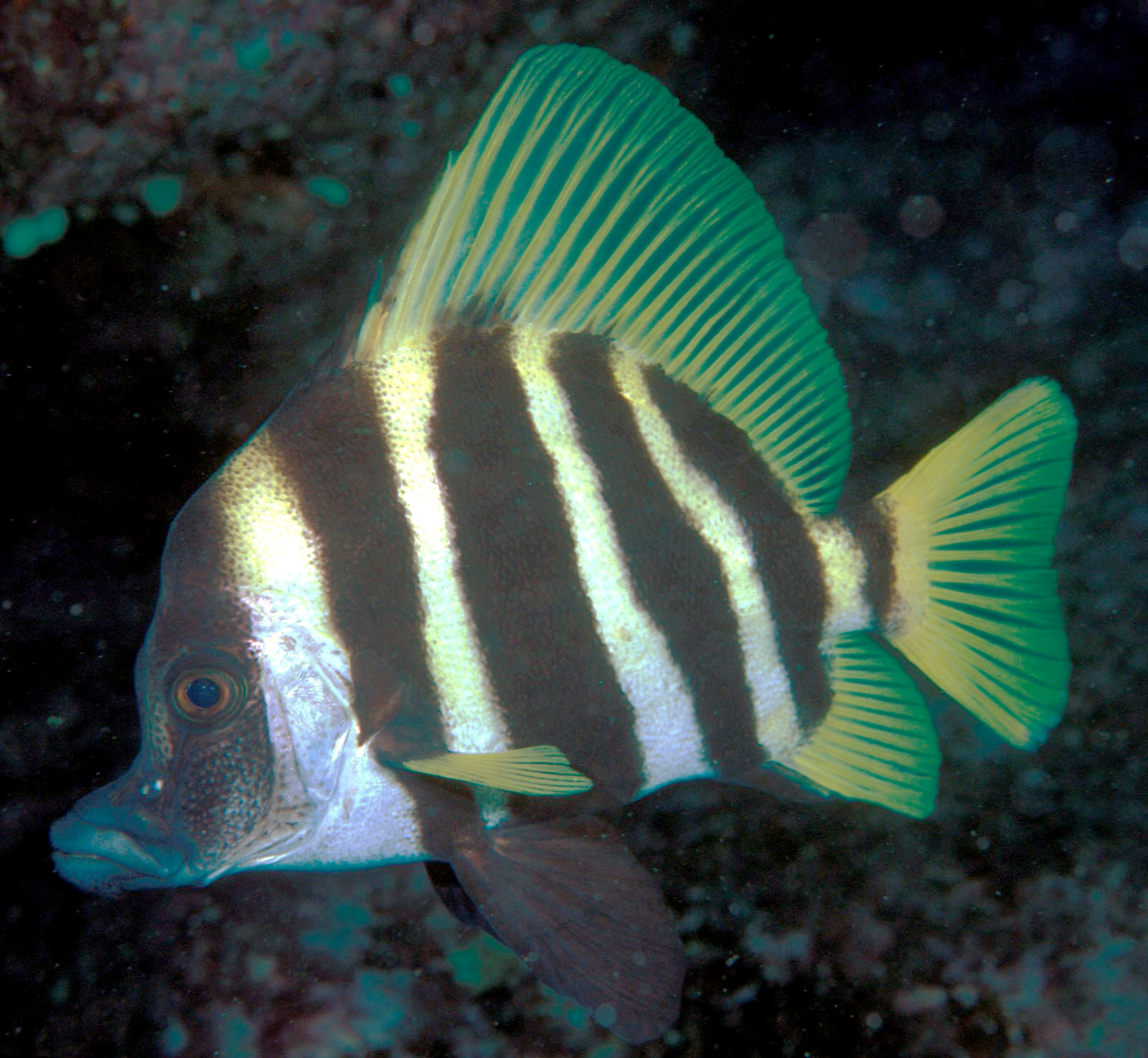

Scientific classification
- Kingdom: Animalia
- Phylum: Chordata
- Class: Actinopterygii
- Division: Teleostei
- Order: Acropomatiformes
- Family: Pentacerotidae
- Subfamily: Histiopterinae
- Genus: Evistias; D. S. Jordan, 1907
- Species: E. acutirostris

Binomial name
- Evistias acutirostris (Temminck & Schlegel, 1844)

Synonyms
- For genus: Evistiopterus Whitley, 1932; For species: Histiopterus acutirostris Temminck & Schlegel, 1844

= Striped boarfish =

Species of fish

The striped boarfish (Evistias acutirostris), also known as whiskered boarfish, Japanese boarfish, sailfin armourhead or whiskered armorhead, is a species of marine ray-finned fish, an armourhead of the family Pentacerotidae, which is native to the Pacific Ocean from the Hawaiian Islands westward to the coast of Asia and Australia. This is a reef-dwelling fish found at depths between 18 and 193 m (59 and 633 ft). It can reach a total length of 90 cm (35 in). It is currently the only known member of the genus Evistias.

== Description ==
The striped boarfish has a very deep body which is steep behind the head and rounded underneath the soft part of the dorsal fin. It has an elongated snout which is sturdy in adults and has dense whisker like structures referred to a villi on the lips and chin, the ones on chin being very long and sometimes branched. The dorsal fin is tall and sail-like, contains 4 or 5 stout spines and 26-28 soft rays and has a convex margin towards the rear. The spines get longer from the front to the back but the front soft rays are longer still than the rear spines. The anal fin has 3-4 spines and 11-14 soft rays. There are five wide dark stripes on the body, and the dorsal, anal and caudal fins are yellow. This species attains a maximum total length of 90 centimetres (35 in).

== Distribution ==
The striped boarfish is found in the Pacific Ocean and has been recorded from Hawaii, Japan, New Zealand, the Kermadec Islands, Lord Howe Island, Norfolk Island and the eastern cost of Australia. It has also been recorded at Easter Island.

== Habitat and biology ==
The striped boarfish is found in coral and rocky reefs, frequently occurring in pairs. It prefers deeper reefs, and is often found near deep rocky drop-offs or over areas of sand substrate at depths of 10–180 metres (33–591 ft). This is a carnivorous species which has been recorded feeding on brittlestars off Hawaii. They feed at night.

== Taxonomy ==
The striped boarfish is the only species in the monospecific genus Evistias and was first formally described as Histiopterus acutirostris in 1844 by Coenraad Jacob Temminck and Hermann Schlegel with the type locality given as Ōmura near Nagasaki on Kyūshū. David Starr Jordan placed it in the monotypic genus Evistias in 1907.
