= Town Hill, Bermuda =

Mountain in Bermuda Island

Town Hill
- Location within Bermuda

Highest point
- Elevation: 79 m (259 ft)
- Prominence: 79 m (259 ft)
- Isolation: 1,136.08 km (705.93 mi)
- Listing: Territory high point
- Coordinates: 32°19′N 64°44′W

Geography
- Location: Bermuda

Town Hill is the highest point on the island of Bermuda at 79 metres (259 ft). It is located just to the south of Flatt's Village, and offers views across Harrington Sound, immediately to its north.
