= Tornadoes in Bermuda =

The British Overseas Territory of Bermuda has been affected by several tornadoes and waterspouts in its history. The strongest of which was an EF1 or 2 in 2009.

== December 1875 tornado ==
On the afternoon of December 17, 1875 the deadliest recorded tornado in Bermudan history formed. A waterspout formed just off shore of the south coast of eastern Bermuda. This waterspout briefly moved on shore for a couple minutes, before moving back over the water, dissipating shortly after. This tornado was only rated FU on the Fujita Scale because there was no recorded damage from the event. However, 5 confirmed fatalities and 2 injuries were reported from this tornado, making it the deadliest Bermudan tornado in history.

== December 1925 tornado ==
In the early hours of December 12, 1925 a weak tornado affected Ireland Island. Beginning as a waterspout, it moved into the Ireland Island Dock Yard. The Ormonde, a ship docked there, was nearly capsized, and the ship's barometer recorded an instantaneous drop of 4 mb. Moving onto land as a tornado, the vortex damaged roofs, sheds, and fences as it tore across the island. An office in the ship yard which contained another weather station was also struck—the barometer there recorded a drop of 6 mb. The damage path was approximately 300 yards across.

== Easter tornadoes of 1953 ==
Four waterspouts moved from south to north over Bermuda in short succession, causing severe damage. About 90 properties were damaged, a few of which were deemed uninhabitable. The first of these storms passed near the Bermuda Meteorological Service, producing two wind gusts over 80 mph (130 km/h) as well as an eight millibar drop in pressure. The third one, which was the most damaging, struck Hamilton and Harrington Sound, killing one person. Several injuries were also confirmed from these storms.

== January 1986 tornadoes ==
On January 12, 1986, two tornadoes struck the north and south shores of the Main Island. The first one, which touched down near Devonshire, caused significant damage as it cut across the island. The second tornado affected St. David's, on the north shore, less than two hours later. Several boats were sunk by the two tornadoes as they moved over water.

== Hurricane Emily September 1987 ==
On September 25, 1987 Hurricane Emily made landfall in Bermuda as a category one hurricane on the Saffir-Simpson Hurricane Wind Scale. The fast moving hurricane was associated with a damaging tornado.

== March 1992 ==
On March 21, 1992, U.S. Naval Oceanography Command Facility later confirmed a tornado struck the east end of the island, damaging the Naval Air Station. Damaged houses in St. David's remained in need some time later and Government assistance was arranged. This tornado was the only Bermudan tornado to be rated other than FU or EFU on the Fujita Scale, being an F0.

== February 1993 ==
Damaging winds, possibly related to tornadic activity impacted the island early in the morning on February 19, 1993. The storms effects were felt hardest in Sandy's Parish and along North Shore. One person was injured and 100 customers lost electricity in the storms.

== April 1993 ==
On April 15, 1993, U.S. Naval Oceanography Command Facility confirmed a tornado struck the west end causing "major damage" before dissipating over the Great Sound. This tornado was followed by heavy rains. Damage was reportedly done to 25 homes in the Somerset area and Government prepared to offer assistance. The severe thunderstorm responsible for this tornado also produced at least "marble sized hail" that covered the ground in spots.

== March 1999 ==
There were several reports of tornadoes on March 4, 1999. One tornado was spotted offshore, and another was spotted later in the day coming ashore in Smith's Parish, damaging a construction site and two homes. The Bermuda Weather Service never concluded if this was a tornado or just strong wind gusts and downbursts.

== April 2000 ==
A reported tornado damaged Spice Valley high school as it struck in the evening on April 27, 2000. The Bermuda Weather Service meteorologists indicated active thunderstorms in the area possibly produced an isolated tornado.

== December 2002 ==
December 14, 2002 saw nighttime tornadoes strike south shore, hitting hotels particularly hard in Southampton parish where $100,000 in property damage was done. The Bermuda Weather Service suggested this could have been a small tornado.

== Hurricane Fabian September 2003 ==
Several unconfirmed reports of tornadoes spawned by Hurricane Fabian as it made a direct-hit on the island on September 5, 2003. One such possible tornado severely damaged St. George's Preparatory school. It was impossible to discern tornado damage from hurricane damage and so these reported tornadoes went unconfirmed.

== January 2004 ==
Weekend severe weather on the morning of January 10, 2004 included reports of tornadoes striking parts of Pembroke, Hamilton, Southampton and Warwick parishes. Damage was reported at the local Saltus Grammar School and nearby neighborhoods in Pembroke where the Bermuda Weather Service confirmed a tornado struck.

== July 2005 ==
A 'freak storm' struck parts of Smith's parish at around 6:30am on July 16, 2005, causing some roof damage. While residents were convinced it was a tornado, and Bermuda Weather Service radar suggested severe weather in the area, they could not conclusively say whether this was tornado damage.

== November 2005 ==
A reported tornado ripped the roofs off several homes in Sandy's parish on the afternoon of November 2, 2005. A later investigation by the Bermuda Weather Service suggested this was the work of a gustnado with gusts up to 80 knots (150 km/h).

== Hurricane Florence September 2006 ==
Unconfirmed reports of tornado damage well in advance of Hurricane Florence in Southampton as the outer bands of the hurricane spiraled across the island on the afternoon of September 10, 2006.

== December 2009 ==
On December 19, 2009, a tornado touched down in downtown Hamilton, Pembroke parish. It created a swath of damage from Pitt's Bay road to First Avenue in the Cavendish Heights area of Pembroke. Hardest hit areas included the commercial areas of Reid Street from Queen Street to Court Street, and parts of Bermudiana Road. Automated recording stations on Hinson's Island reported a wind gust of 64 knots (74 mph; 119 km/h). Although there were no reports of serious injuries, there was significant tree and roof damage, and the tornado was estimated to be an EF1 or EF2 on the Enhanced Fujita Scale. There were other reports of tornadoes that turned out to be straight line winds from severe thunderstorms at Devonshire Bay, where trees were snapped and a fence was reported to have been knocked over.

== April 2011 ==
On the afternoon of April 6, 2011, an EFU tornado formed on the shore of Hamilton Parish, moving across Hamilton Parish and dissipating after going off shore on the opposite side of the island. This tornado was rated EFU. However, there was decent roof damage to several houses, some tree branches snapped, and furniture on porches thrown around with minor damage. This tornado was the equivalent of an EF0 in winds and damages, although the Bermuda Weather Service never claimed it was an EF0, nor was it even mentioned it was rated, making it an EFU.

== Hurricane Sandy October 2012 ==
On October 28, 2012, showers associated with the outermost circulation of a distant Hurricane Sandy were affecting the island. One of these showers briefly produced a tornado that resulted in roof damage and boundary wall damage to structures in Somerset Village in Sandy's Parish. The Bermuda Weather Service rated the tornado F0 on the Fujita Scale.

== July 2018 ==
A weak, fair-weather waterspout formed over Grotto Bay on the morning of July 2 as a squall line moved across the island. Upon making landfall at Grotto Bay Beach Resort, the tornado tossed around furniture before dissipating. The Bermuda Weather Service confirmed the waterspout in Grotto Bay from St. David's.
