= Bermuda hotspot =

Proposed hotspot in the Atlantic Ocean

Coordinates: 32°31′02″N 65°00′57″W

The Bermuda hotspot is a theoretical midplate hotspot swell in the Atlantic Ocean 500–1,000 km (310–620 mi) southeast of Bermuda, proposed to explain the extinct volcanoes of the Bermuda Rise as well as the Mississippi Embayment and the Sabine Uplift southwest of the Mississippi Embayment.

A 2002 paper proposes that the Bermuda hotspot generated the Mississippi Embayment in the Early Cretaceous Epoch, when the hotspot strengthened and uplifted the present-day Mississippi Valley. The resulting highland eroded over time, and when North American Plate motion moved the valley away from the hotspot, the resulting thinned lithosphere subsided, forming a trough. The seismic zones centered on New Madrid, Missouri, and Charleston, South Carolina, and the volcanic kimberlite pipes in Arkansas are cited as evidence.

Other published reports argue that the lack of a chain of age-progressive seamounts (as in the Hawaiian-Emperor seamount chain), the absence of present-day volcanism, and the elongation of the Bermuda Rise oblique to plate motion are evidence against a hotspot origin for the Bermuda Rise. Others alternatively attribute the Bermuda Rise to a reorganization of plate tectonics associated with the closing of the Tethys Sea, though noting that shallow processes may not explain the source of the magmatism. A more recent paper finds a thinning in the mantle transition zone under Bermuda, apparently consistent with mantle upwelling and a hot lower mantle below Bermuda. A still more recent paper, based on geochemical analysis of a drill core, suggests that Bermuda volcanism sampled a transient mantle reservoir in the mantle transition zone that was formed by chemical recycling related to subduction during the formation of Pangaea.

== See also ==
- Bermuda Pedestal
