= Mississippi embayment =

Low-lying basin filled with Cretaceous to recent sediments

Coordinates: 33.751°N 89.681°W

The Mississippi embayment stretches from central Louisiana into southern Missouri.

The Mississippi embayment is a physiographic feature in the south-central United States, part of the Mississippi Alluvial Plain. It is essentially a northward continuation of the fluvial sediments of the Mississippi River Delta to its confluence with the Ohio River at Cairo, Illinois. The current sedimentary area was formed in the Cretaceous and early Cenozoic by the filling with sediment of a pre-existing basin. An explanation for the embayment's formation was put forward by Van Arsdale and Cox in 2007: movement of the Earth's crust brought this region over a volcanic "hotspot" in the Earth's mantle causing an upthrust of magma which formed the Appalachian-Ouachita range. Subsequent erosion caused a deep trough that was flooded by the Gulf of Mexico and eventually filled with sediment from the Mississippi River.

== Geography ==
The embayment is a topographically low-lying basin that is filled with Cretaceous to recent sediments. The northern end of the embayment appears as an anomalous break in regional geologic structure with Paleozoic sedimentary rocks both to the east in Kentucky and Tennessee and to the west in Missouri and Arkansas. The current sedimentary basin results from the filling of a Cretaceous tectonic basin and existed as a large bay in the Cretaceous through the early Cenozoic shoreline.

The New Madrid Seismic Zone lies at the northern end of the embayment. It was the site of the large New Madrid earthquakes of 1811–12. The area is underlain by some anomalous geology. The Reelfoot Rift is an ancient failed continental rift, an aulacogen, which dates back to the Precambrian break-up of the supercontinent Rodinia. The more recent opening of the Atlantic Ocean and Gulf of Mexico during late Paleozoic to early Mesozoic break-up of Pangea no doubt affected and may have partially re-activated the old rift.

== Formation of the embayment ==
The Mississippi embayment represents a break in what was once a single, continuous mountain range comprising the modern Appalachian range, which runs roughly on a north–south axis along the Atlantic coast of the United States, and the Ouachita range, which runs on a rough east–west axis west of the Mississippi River. The ancestral Appalachian-Ouachita range was thrust up when the tectonic plate carrying North America came into contact with the plates carrying South America and Africa when all three became joined in the ancient supercontinent Pangaea about 300 million years ago.

As Pangaea began to break up about 200 million years ago, North America passed over a volcanic "hotspot" in the Earth's mantle (specifically, the Bermuda hotspot) that was undergoing a period of intense activity. The upwelling of magma from the hotspot forced the further uplift to a height of perhaps 2–3 km of part of the Appalachian-Ouachita range, forming an arch. The uplifted land quickly eroded and, as North America moved away from the hot spot and as the hotspot's activity declined, the crust beneath the embayment region cooled, contracted and subsided to a depth of 2.6 km, forming a trough that was flooded by the Gulf of Mexico. As sea levels dropped, the Mississippi and other rivers extended their courses into the embayment, which gradually became filled with sediment.

Evidence for this explanation is found in the presence of the seismic zones centered on New Madrid, Missouri, and Charleston, South Carolina, each the source of devastating earthquakes in the 19th century, and in diamond-bearing kimberlite pipes in Arkansas, which are products of volcanism.

== Maps ==
Significant shorelines along the U.S. Gulf and Atlantic Coasts since the Cretaceous Period

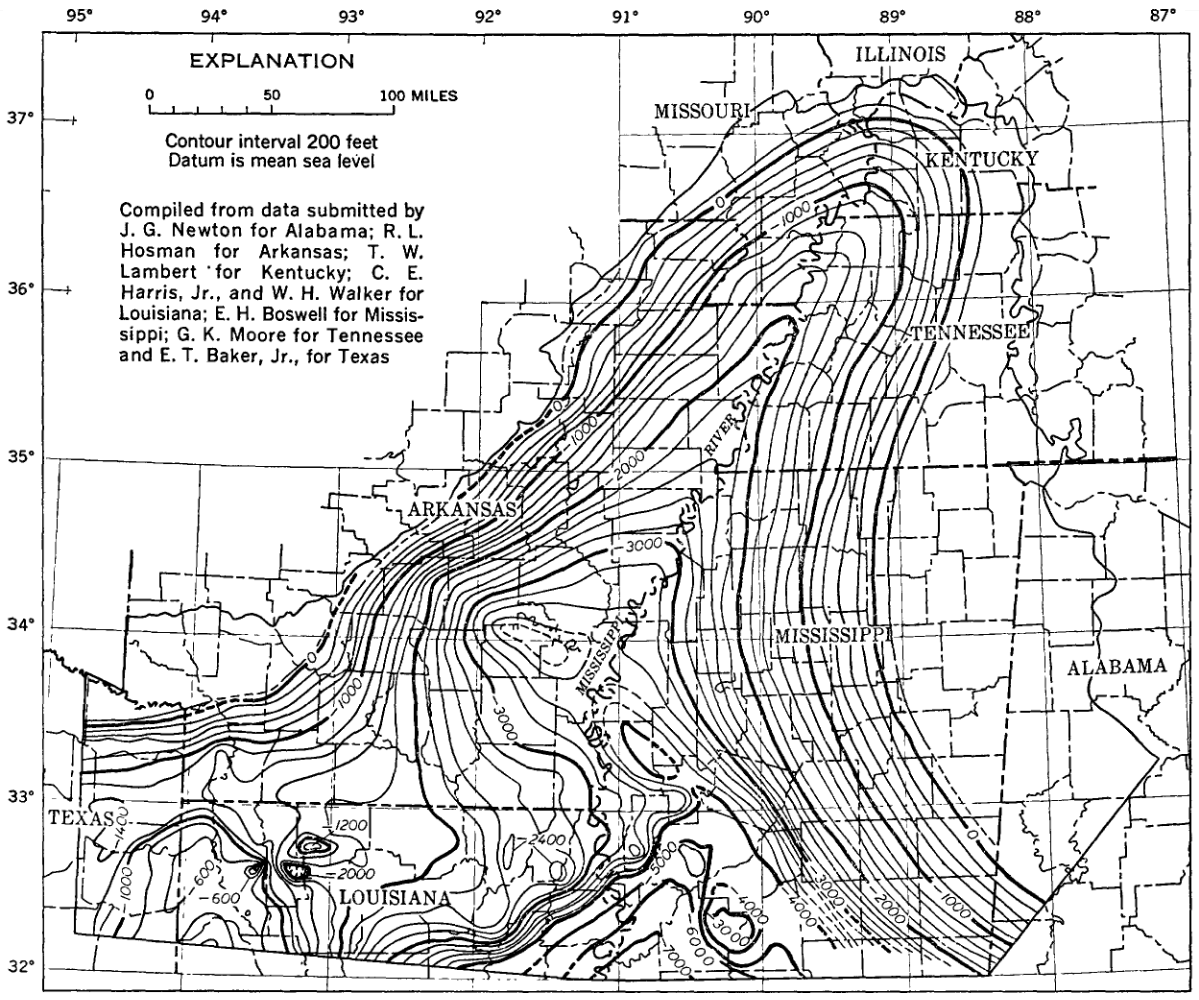
Mississippi Embayment Top Cretaceous Contour Map

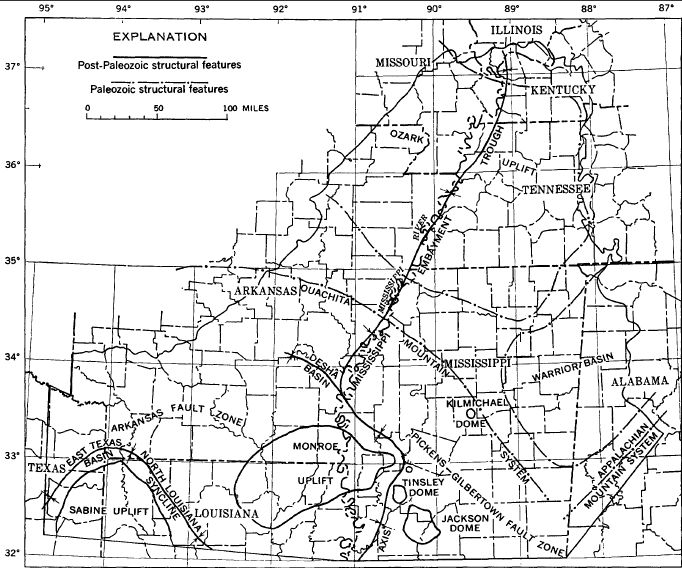
Mississippi Embayment Structural Map

== See also ==
- Arkansas Delta – Natural region of Arkansas
- Missouri Bootheel – Geographic region of Missouri, US
- Crowley's Ridge – Geological formation in Arkansas and Missouri, U.S.
- Mississippi Delta – Northwest section of the U.S. state of Mississippi
