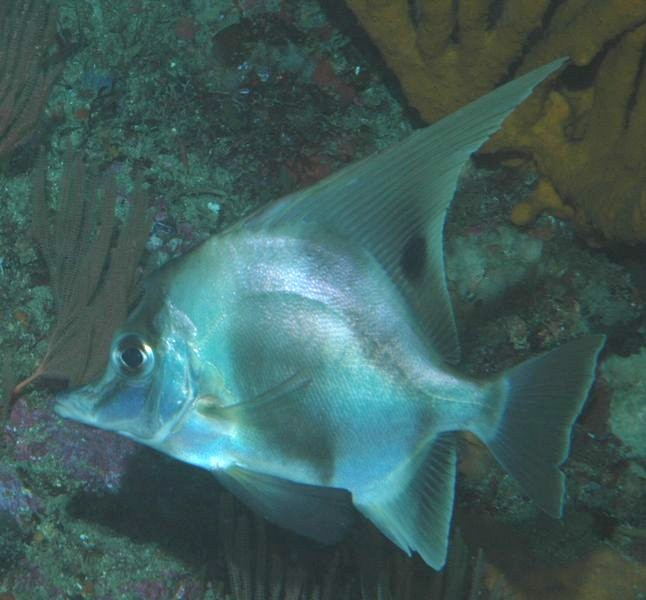
- Longfin boarfish, Zanclistius elevatus

Scientific classification
- Kingdom: Animalia
- Phylum: Chordata
- Class: Actinopterygii
- Order: Acropomatiformes
- Family: Pentacerotidae; Bleeker, 1859

Genera
- see text

= Pentacerotidae =

Family of ray-finned fishes

Pentacerotidae, commonly known as armourheads are a small family of ray-finned fishes in the order Acropomatiformes. They are native to the Indian Ocean, western and central Pacific, and southwestern Atlantic. They are generally found at rocky reefs below normal scuba diving depths, although several species occur in low densities at shallower depths.

Their name, from Greek pente meaning "five" and keras meaning "horn", refers to the prominent, sharp spines in their dorsal fins (though these do not number five in all species). The largest species in the family (Paristiopterus) may reach a length of 1 m (3.3 ft). Many species have distinct dark-and-light-striped bodies, while others are overall dusky-silvery.

== Genera ==
The following genera are classified within the family into two subfamilies:

- Subfamily Histiopterinae Bleeker, 1876
  - Evistias Jordan, 1907
  - Histiopterus Temminck & Schlegel, 1844
  - Parazanclistius Hardy, 1983
  - Paristiopterus Bleeker, 1876
  - Pentaceropsis Steindachner, 1883
  - Zanclistius Jordan, 1907
- Subfamily Pentacerotinae Bleeker, 1859
  - Pentaceros Cuvier, 1829

The fossil genus †Portentosoceros Nazarkin & Bannikov, 2021 from the Middle Miocene of Sakhalin, Russia, which closely resembles Pentaceros and was previously placed in it, lacks some of the characteristic features of this family and its taxonomic placement is uncertain outside of it belonging to the percomorphs. However, it is likely a close relative of the armorheads.
