= List of geophysicists =

This is a list of geophysicists, people who made notable contributions to geophysics, whether or not geophysics was their primary field. These include historical figures who laid the foundations for the field of geophysics. More recently, some of the top awards for geophysicists are the Vetlesen Prize (intended to be the equivalent of a Nobel Prize for geology or geophysics); the William Bowie Medal (the top award of the American Geophysical Union); the Maurice Ewing Medal (the top award of the Society of Exploration Geophysicists); and the Crafoord Prize for geosciences. Some geophysicists have also won more general prizes such as the Nobel Prize and the Kyoto Prize.

== A ==
- Leason Adams (American, 1887–1969) – high pressure mineral physics
- Thomas J Ahrens (American, 1936–2010) – experimental methods for modeling hypervelocity impacts and materials in the Earth's core and mantle
- Hannes Alfvén (Swedish, 1908–1995) – Alfvén waves, magnetohydrodynamics of magnetosphere; Nobel Prize in Physics
- Giuseppina Aliverti (Italian, 1894–1982) – geophysicist remembered for developing the Aliverti-Lovera method of measuring the radioactivity of water
- Keiiti Aki (Japanese-American, 1930–2005) – seismology; William Bowie Medal
- Claude Allègre (French, 1937– ) Crafoord Prize
- Don L. Anderson (American, 1933–2014) – seismology and Earth's interior (including the Preliminary reference Earth model); Crafoord Prize
- Nigel Anstey (British, 1927– ) – exploration geophysicist; Maurice Ewing Medal (SEG)
- Tanya Atwater (American, 1942– ) – plate tectonic history of North America

== B ==
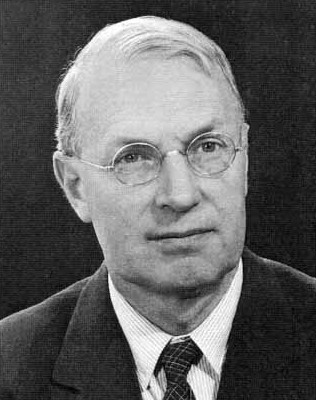
Francis Birch

- George Edward Backus (American, 1930– ) – geophysical mathematician, development of geophysical inverse methods; contributions to dynamo theory
- Milo Backus (American, 1932–2018) – exploration geophysicist; practical 3D exploration; Maurice Ewing Medal (SEG)
- Peter Barlow (English, 1776–1862) – experimental and observational studies of terrestrial magnetism, Copley Medal
- Anthony R. Barringer (Canadian/American, 1925–2009) – developed the INPUT airborne electromagnetic system for detecting ores; Maurice Ewing Medal (SEG)
- Julius Bartels (German, 1899–1964) – contributed to physics of the Sun and Moon; geomagnetism, meteorology and the physics of the ionosphere
- Louis Bauer (American, 1865–1932) – mapped the Earth's magnetic field
- Hugo Benioff (American, 1899–1968) – discovered link between deep earthquakes and subduction zones
- Lloyd Berkner (American, 1905–1967) – studied the ionosphere
- Henry Bryant Bigelow (American, 1879–1967) – awarded the William Bowie Medal
- Francis Birch (American, 1903–1992) – developed theoretical and experimental models for the Earth's interior; Vetlesen Prize
- Kristian Birkeland (Norwegian, 1867–1917) – first realized that energetic electrons cause the aurora; nominated 7 times for Nobel Prize
- Abu Rayhan Biruni (Persian, 973–1048) – made accurate measure of circumference of Earth and other contributions to geodesy
- Jacob Bjerknes (Norwegian-American, 1897–1975) – awarded the William Bowie Medal
- Patrick Blackett (English, 1897–1974) – paleomagnetism, continental drift, Nobel Prize
- Martin Bott (British, 1926–2018) – magnetic anomalies, gravity anomalies
- Pierre Bouguer (French, 1698–1758) – geodesy; the Bouguer gravity anomaly
- William Bowie (American, 1872–1940) – geodesy and isostasy
- Wallace Smith Broecker (American, 1931–2019) – climate, ocean circulation; Crafoord Prize, Vetlesen Prize
- Bernard Brunhes (French, 1867–1910) – paleomagnetism; discovered the first geomagnetic reversal
- Walter Hermann Bucher (German-American, 1888–1965) – awarded the William Bowie Medal
- Edward Bullard (British, 1907–1980) – developed theory of geodynamo, pioneered use of seismology to study the sea floor, and used seafloor bathymetry to test continental drift
- Keith Edward Bullen (New Zealand-born, 1906–1976) – seismological interpretation of the deep structure of the Earth's mantle and core
- Victor Robertovich Bursian (Russian, 1886–1945) – pioneer in theory of Electrical resistivity tomography

== C ==
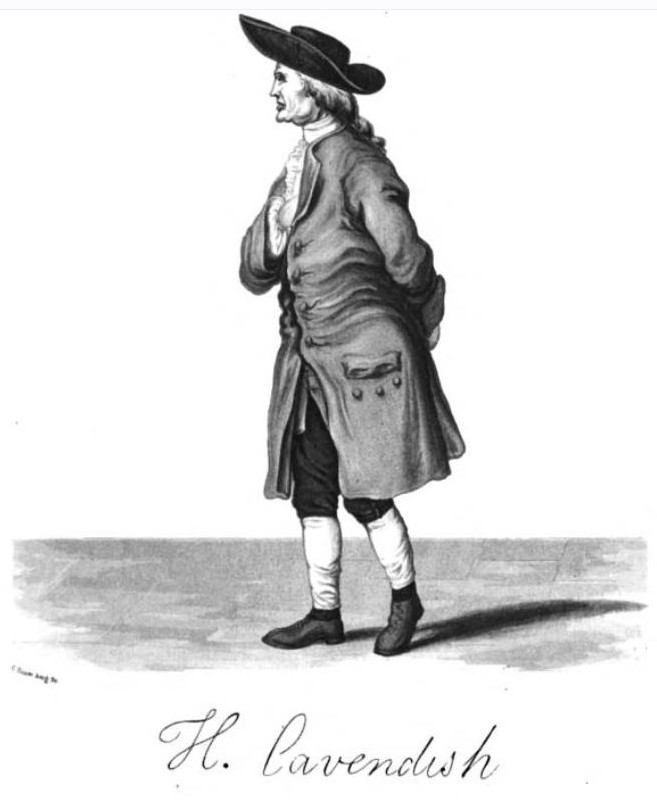
Henry Cavendish

- Henry Cavendish (British, 1731–1810) – made first estimate of the mass of the Earth
- Anny Cazenave (French, 1944– ) – geodesy and satellite altimetry; awarded William Bowie Medal
- Vlastislav Cervený (Czech) – exploration geophysicist; seismic ray theory; Maurice Ewing Medal (SEG)
- Sydney Chapman (British, 1888–1970) – predicted magnetosphere; developed theories for effect of solar wind on geomagnetic storms and aurorae
- Jule Gregory Charney (American, 1917–1981) – dynamical meteorology; awarded William Bowie Medal
- Jon Claerbout (American, 1937– ) – exploration geophysics seismic data processing and imaging; Maurice Ewing Medal (SEG)
- Alexis Clairaut (French, 1713–1765) – proved Clairaut's theorem and calculated the ellipticity of the Earth
- William Compston (Australian, 1931– ) – developed the Sensitive High Resolution Ion Micro Probe for isotopic analyses of geological samples
- Vincent Courtillot (French, 1948– ) – paleomagnetist; promoted theory that mass extinctions are caused by massive volcanic episodes
- Thomas Cowling (English, 1906–1990) – solar magnetic field, dynamo theory
- Allan V. Cox (American, 1926–1987) – created a timeline for geomagnetic reversals and was a pioneer in plate tectonics; Vetlesen Prize
- Albert P. Crary (American, 1911–1987) – Arctic and Antarctic exploration, seismology

== D ==
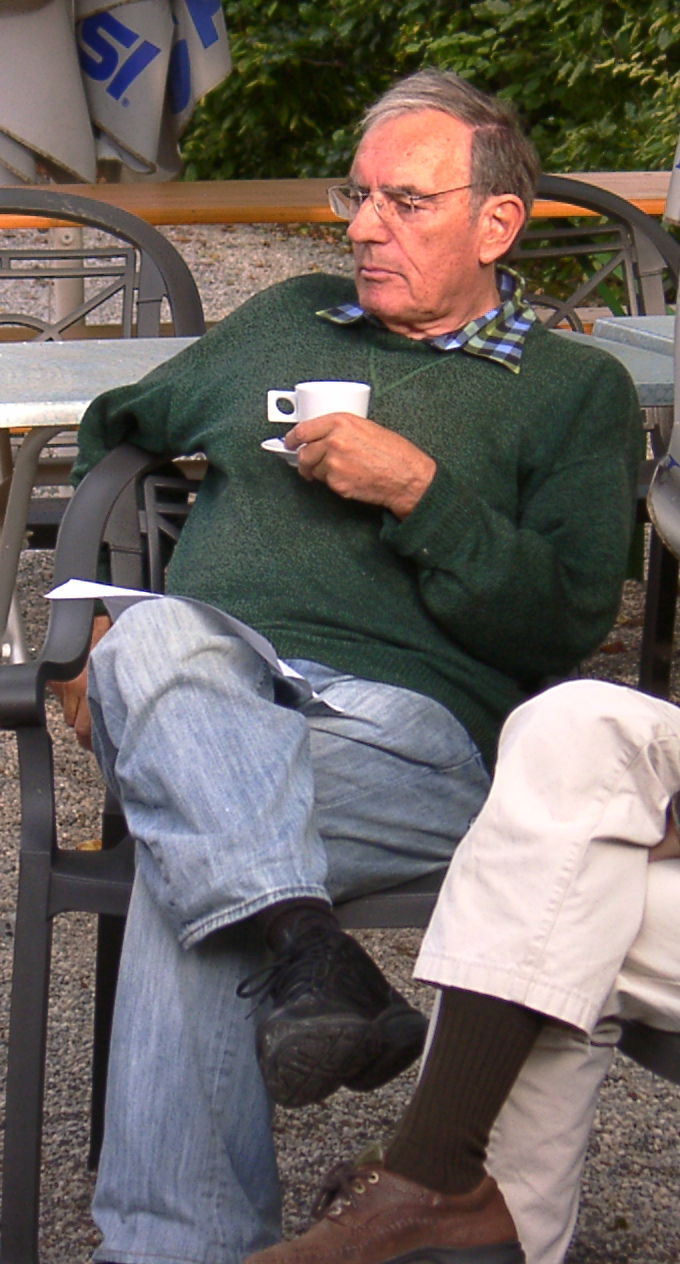
Adam Dziewoński

- Reginald Aldworth Daly (Canadian, 1871–1957) – awarded the William Bowie Medal
- George Howard Darwin (British, 1845–1912) – analyzed tides and tidal friction; first to develop mathematical theory for evolution of the Sun–Earth–Moon system
- Arthur Louis Day (American, 1869–1960) – mineral physics and volcanology
- Everette Lee DeGolyer (American, 1886–1956) – exploration geophysics in the petroleum industry
- Robert S. Dietz (American, 1914–1995) – proposed (and named) – theory of seafloor spreading; discovered several impact craters including Sudbury Basin
- Hewitt Dix (American, 1905–1987) – exploration geophysics; creator of the Dix equation for reflection velocity, recipient of the Maurice Ewing Medal
- Richard Doell (American, 1923–2008) – created a timeline for geomagnetic reversals and was a pioneer in plate tectonics; Vetlesen Prize
- James Dooge (Irish, 1922–2010) – hydrology
- Erich von Drygalski (German, 1865–1949) – polar explorer and geophysicist
- Adam Dziewonski (Polish/American, 1936–2016) – large-scale structure of Earth's interior and nature of earthquakes; Crafoord Prize

== E ==
- Carl Eckart (American, 1902–1973) – underwater acoustics; awarded William Bowie Medal
- Walter M. Elsasser (American, 1904–1991) – first mathematical dynamo theory for Earth's outer core
- Loránd Eötvös (Hungarian, 1848–1919) – developed a highly accurate torsion balance for gravimetry
- Eratosthenes (Greek, c. 276 BC–195 BC) – measured circumference of the Earth and the tilt of its axis
- Maurice Ewing (American, 1906–1974) – broad contributions to seafloor seismology; predicted and discovered the SOFAR channel

== F ==
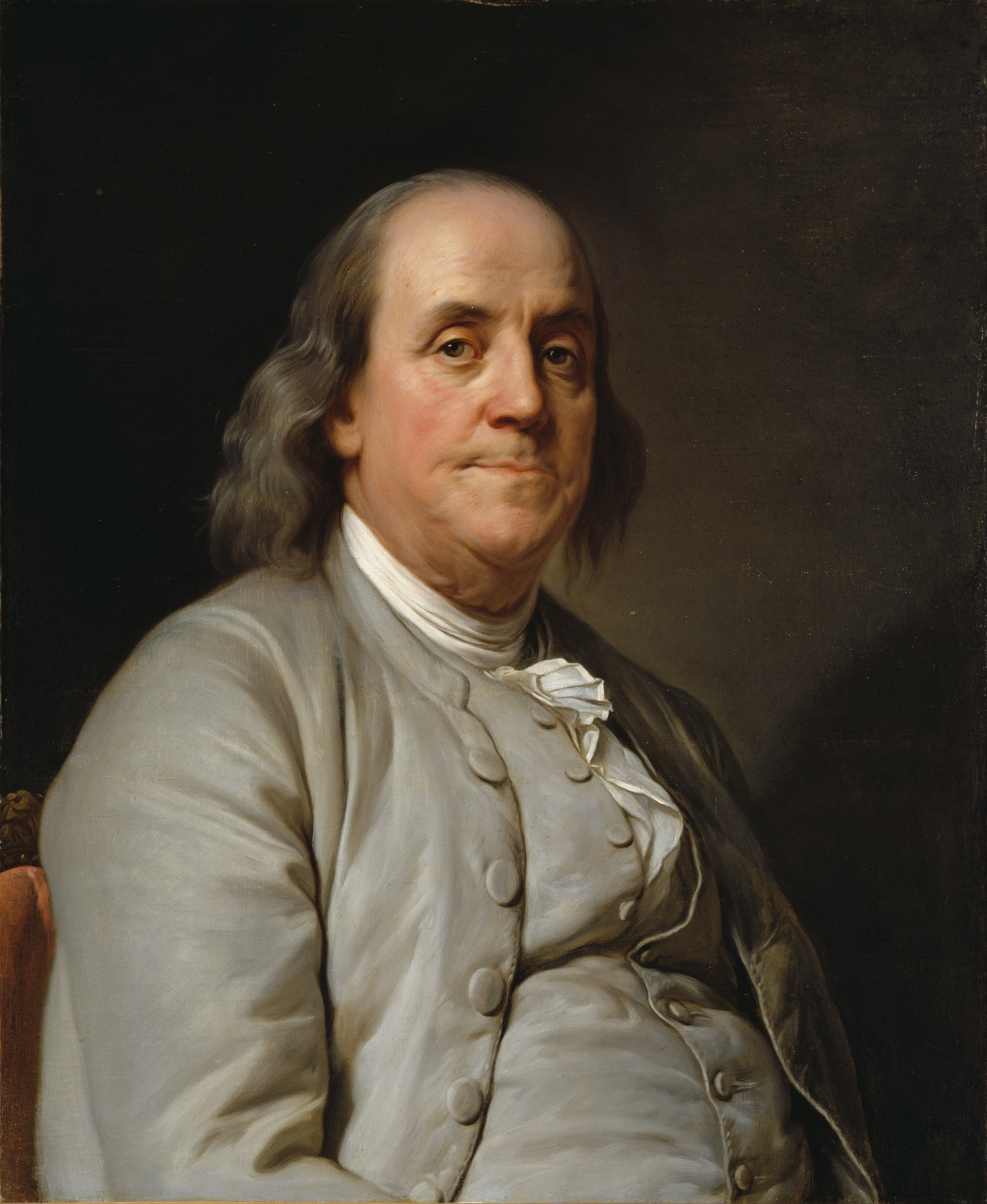
Benjamin Franklin

- Gerhard Fanselau (German, 1904–1982) – geomagnetic observations
- Joseph Charles Farman (British, 1930–2013) – co-discoverer of the ozone hole
- Yevgeny Konstantinovich Fyodorov (Russian, 1910–1981) – pioneer in Arctic geophysical survey
- Osmond Fisher (British, 1817–1914) – continental drift
- John Adam Fleming (American, 1877–1956) – magnetosphere and atmospheric electricity
- James David Forbes (British, 1809–1868) – built the first seismometer
- Scott Forbush (American, 1904–1984) – solar-terrestrial interactions and the Forbush decrease
- Efi Foufoula-Georgiou (Greek, 1957–) – wavelet analysis
- Gillian Foulger (English, 1952– ) – plate theory
- Robert Were Fox the Younger (British, 1789–1877) – discovered the geothermal gradient; constructed a dip circle for use at sea
- Benjamin Franklin (American, 1706–1790) – established that lightning is electrical

== G ==
- Carl Friedrich Gauss (German, 1777–1855) – first mathematical representation of Earth's magnetic field; geodetic surveys
- Henry Gellibrand (English, 1597–1637) – discovered that magnetic declination varies with time
- James Freeman Gilbert (American, 1931–2014) – development of geophysical inverse theory; network of seismometers to study Earth's free oscillation
- William Gilbert (English, 1544–1603) – early magnetic experiments; first to argue that the Earth itself is magnetic
- George Graham (English 1673 – November 1751) – discovery of the diurnal variation of the Earth's magnetic field; related Aurora borealis to magnetic field variations
- Cecil H. Green (British-born American, 1900–2003) – exploration geophysics geophysical entrepreneur and philanthropist; Maurice Ewing Medal (SEG)
- Harsh Gupta (Indian, 1942– ) – methodology for discriminating normal earthquakes from reservoir-induced ones, study on the genesis of stable continental region earthquakes; Padma Shri, Shanti Swarup Bhatnagar Prize and Waldo E. Smith Award
- Beno Gutenberg (American, 1889–1960) – probability distribution of earthquake energies and relation of energy to magnitude

== H ==
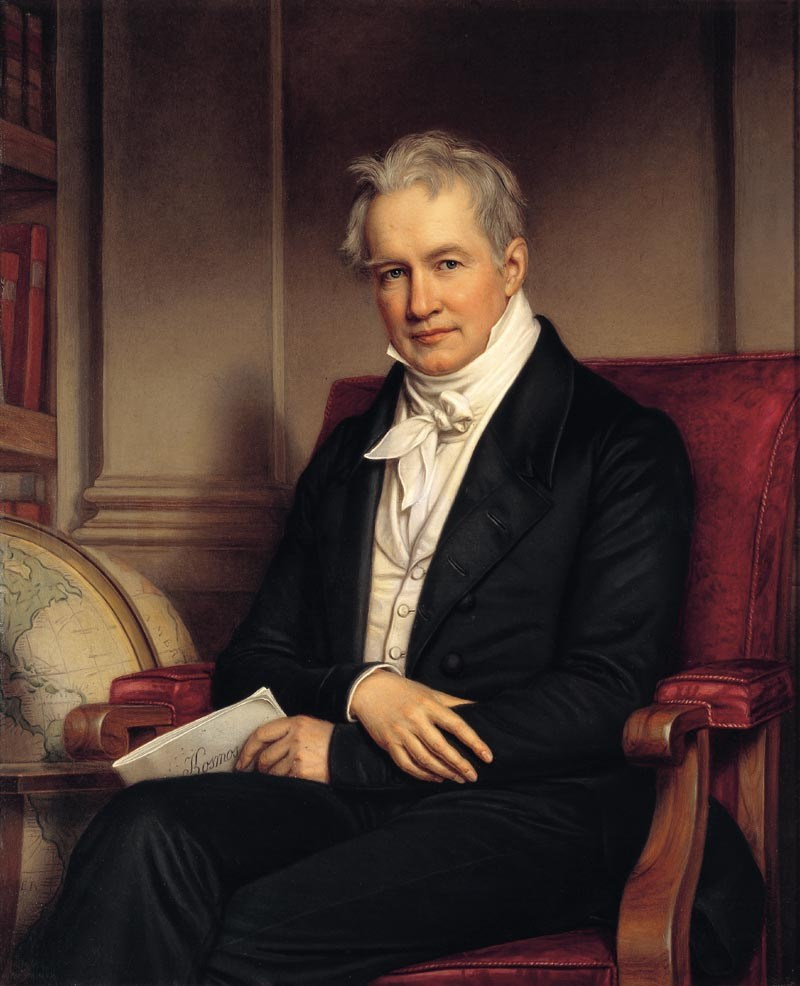
Alexander von Humboldt in 1843

- Edmond Halley (English, 1656–1742) – first chart of Earth's magnetic field
- Christopher Hansteen (Norwegian, 1784–1873) – produced the first charts of the intensity of the Earth's magnetic field
- Harry Hammond Hess (American, 1906–1969) – seafloor gravity anomalies and theory of seafloor spreading
- Georg Hartmann (German, 1489–1564) – kept early records of magnetic declination
- Bernhard Haurwitz (American, 1905–1986) – meteorology
- Veikko Aleksanteri Heiskanen (Finnish, 1895–1971) – studies of the global geoid
- Raymond Hide (British, 1929–2016)
- Arthur Holmes (British, 1890–1965) – performed first uranium–lead dating
- M. King Hubbert (American, 1903–1989) – correct statement of Darcy's law and mathematical demonstration that rock undergoes plastic deformation; Vetlesen Prize
- Alexander von Humboldt (German, 1769–1859) – global network of geomagnetic observatories
- Rosemary Hutton (Scottish, 1925–2004) – geophysicist and pioneer of magnetotellurics

== I ==
- Akitsune Imamura (Japanese, 1870–1948) – seismologist
- Ted Irving (Canadian, 1927–2014) – early paleomagnetic evidence for continental drift
- Ahmet Mete Işıkara (Turkish, 1941–2013) – earthquake scientist
- Bryan Isacks (American, 1936–2026) - seismologist, provided evidence for plate tectonics

== J ==
- James A. Jackson (English, 1954– ) – seismologist; contributed to rebuttal of the 'jelly sandwich' model of the crust
- John Arthur “Jack” Jacobs (English 1916 – 2003) - primary area of research was geomagnetism
- Harold Jeffreys (British, 1891–1989) – deduced that the Earth's outer core is molten; contributed to mathematical geophysics; Vetlesen Prize
- Lucy Jones (American, 1955– ) – earthquake science and safety
- Thomas H. Jordan (American, 1948– ) – seismic contributions to plate tectonics

== K ==
- Hiroo Kanamori (American, 1936– ) – fundamental contributions to the physics of earthquakes; Kyoto Prize
- Louise H. Kellogg (American, 1959–2019) – modeling of the Earth's mantle
- William Thomson, Lord Kelvin (Irish, 1824–1907) – influential estimate of the age of the Earth, ultimately proved incorrect
- Alexander A. Kaufman (Russian-American, 1931–2023) – major contributions to time-domain electromagnetic (TDEM) methods and through-casing resistivity measurements.

== L ==
- Kurt Lambeck (Dutch, 1941– ) – changed understanding of the ways post-glacial rebound affects ocean levels; awarded Wollaston Medal and Balzan Prize
- Johann von Lamont (Scottish, 1805–1879) – surveys of the Earth's magnetic field
- Louis J. Lanzerotti (American, 1938– ) – magnetosphere and ionosphere; awarded William Bowie Medal
- Joseph Larmor (Northern Irish, 1857–1942) – proton precession, dynamo theory
- Thorne Lay (American, 1956– ) - seismologist
- Inge Lehmann (Danish, 1888–1993) – seismologist who discovered the Lehmann discontinuity and argued for a solid inner core
- Xavier Le Pichon (French, 1937–2025) – constructed history of plate motions
- Humphrey Lloyd (Irish, 1800–1881) – observational geomagnetism
- Cinna Lomnitz (Chilean–Mexican, 1925–2016) – creator of "Lomnitz Law", founder of Mexico's first seismic network and editor of Geofísica Internacional
- Andrew Long (Australian, 1965– ) – developed widely used instruments for marine exploration for oil and gas; Honorary Lecturer (Pacific South) for the Society of Exploration Geophysicists
- Augustus Edward Hough Love (English, 1863–1940) – developed theory of Love waves
- Bruce P. Luyendyk (American, 1943– ) – marine geophysics
- Leon Thomsen (American, 1942 ) - Seismic anisotropy Thomsen parameters (Awards: Maurice Ewing Medal, N.A.E.)

== M ==
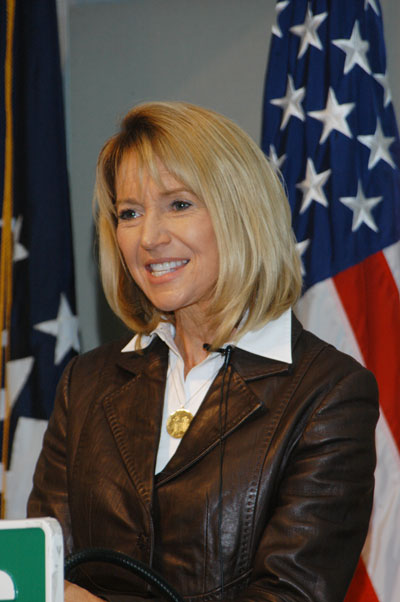
Marcia McNutt

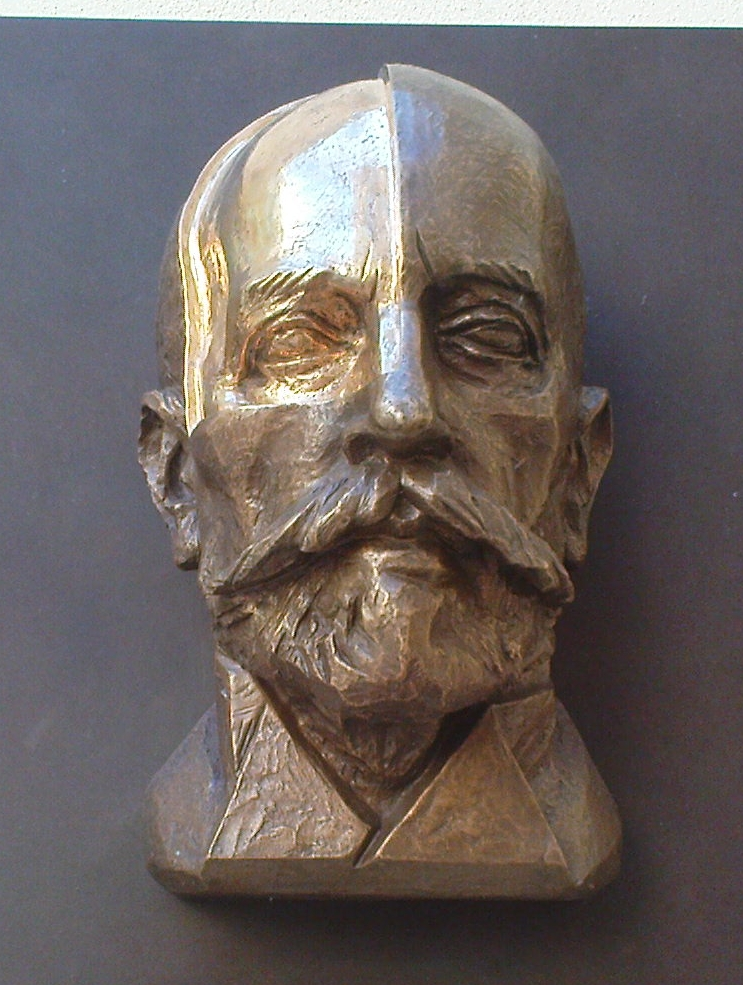
Andrija Mohorovičić

- Gordon J. F. MacDonald (American, 1929–2002) – investigated rotation of the Earth and true polar wander
- James B. Macelwane (American, 1883–1956) – seismologist; awarded William Bowie Medal
- Jean-Jacques d'Ortous de Mairan (French, 1678 –1771) – shape of the Earth and aurora
- Robert Mallet (Irish, 1810–1881) – developed controlled source seismology; coined terms seismology and epicenter
- Syukuro Manabe (Japanese, 1931– ) – climate models; awarded William Bowie Medal
- Pierre de Maricourt (Petrus Peregrinus) (French, fl. 1269) – first extant treatise on properties of magnets; detailed study of the compass
- Edme Mariotte (French, 1620–1684) – one of the pioneers of modern hydrology; used floats to measure river flow
- Samuel Martínez Roque (Mexican, 1998— ) - urban planner, spatial data scientist, public health professional, and writer, whose research has addressed healthcare accessibility, urban inequalities, aging populations, and spatial analysis, with particular attention to the United States–Mexico border region, especially Ciudad Juárez.
- Drummond Matthews (British, 1931–1997) – used ocean magnetic anomalies to confirm theory of seafloor spreading
- Motonori Matuyama (Japanese, 1884–1958) – first to show that a geomagnetic reversal had occurred in the past
- Dan McKenzie (British, 1942– ) – mathematical framework for plate tectonics; mantle convection; sedimentary basin formation; Crafoord Prize
- Harry Mayne (American, 1913–1990) – exploration geophysicist, invented CRP stacking for noise reduction; Maurice Ewing Medal (SEG)
- Desmond McConnell (British, (1930–2026)- mineral physics
- Marcia McNutt (American, 1952– ) – elastic strength of lithosphere; identified the South Pacific superswell
- Felix Andries Vening Meinesz (Dutch, 1887–1966) – developed a precise gravimeter and discovered gravity anomalies above the ocean floor
- Oscar Edward Meinzer (American, 1876–1948) – groundwater hydrology; awarded William Bowie Medal
- Henry William Menard (American, 1920–1986) – plate tectonics; awarded William Bowie Medal
- Giuseppe Mercalli (Italian, 1850–1914) – developed Mercalli intensity scale for measuring earthquakes
- John Milne (British, 1849–1913) – invented the horizontal pendulum seismograph
- Andrija Mohorovičić (Croatian, 1857–1936) – identified Mohorovičić discontinuity;
- W. Jason Morgan (American, 1935–2023) – geodynamics, plate tectonics
- Jean Morlet (French, 1931–2007) – developed the wavelet transform for exploration geophysics
- Lawrence Morley (Canadian, 1920–2013)) – used ocean magnetic anomalies to confirm theory of seafloor spreading
- Ahsan Mubarak (Pakistani, ?) – seismic detection of nuclear tests
- Walter Munk (American, 1917–2019) – rotation of the Earth; acoustic tomography of the oceans; Crafoord Prize, Vetlesen Prize, Kyoto Prize

== N ==
- Louis Néel (French, 1904–2000) – developed theory to explain the stable magnetization in volcanic rocks; Nobel Prize in physics
- Marcia Neugebauer (American, 1932– ) – space physicist and president of the American Geophysical Union
- Marcel Nicolet (Belgian, 1912–1996) – ionosphere; awarded William Bowie Medal
- Robert Norman (English, circa 1550–1600) – re-discovery of magnetic dip
- Amos Nur (American, 1938–2024) – exploration geophysics; rock physics; Maurice Ewing Medal (SEG)

== O ==
- Abel Idowu Olayinka (Nigerian, 1958– ) – applied geophysicist
- Richard Dixon Oldham (British, 1858–1936) – seismologist, first clear evidence for separate arrivals of P-waves, S-waves and surface waves on seismograms; first clear evidence for Earth's core
- Jack Oliver (American, 1923–2011) - seismologist, provided evidence for plate tectonics

== P ==
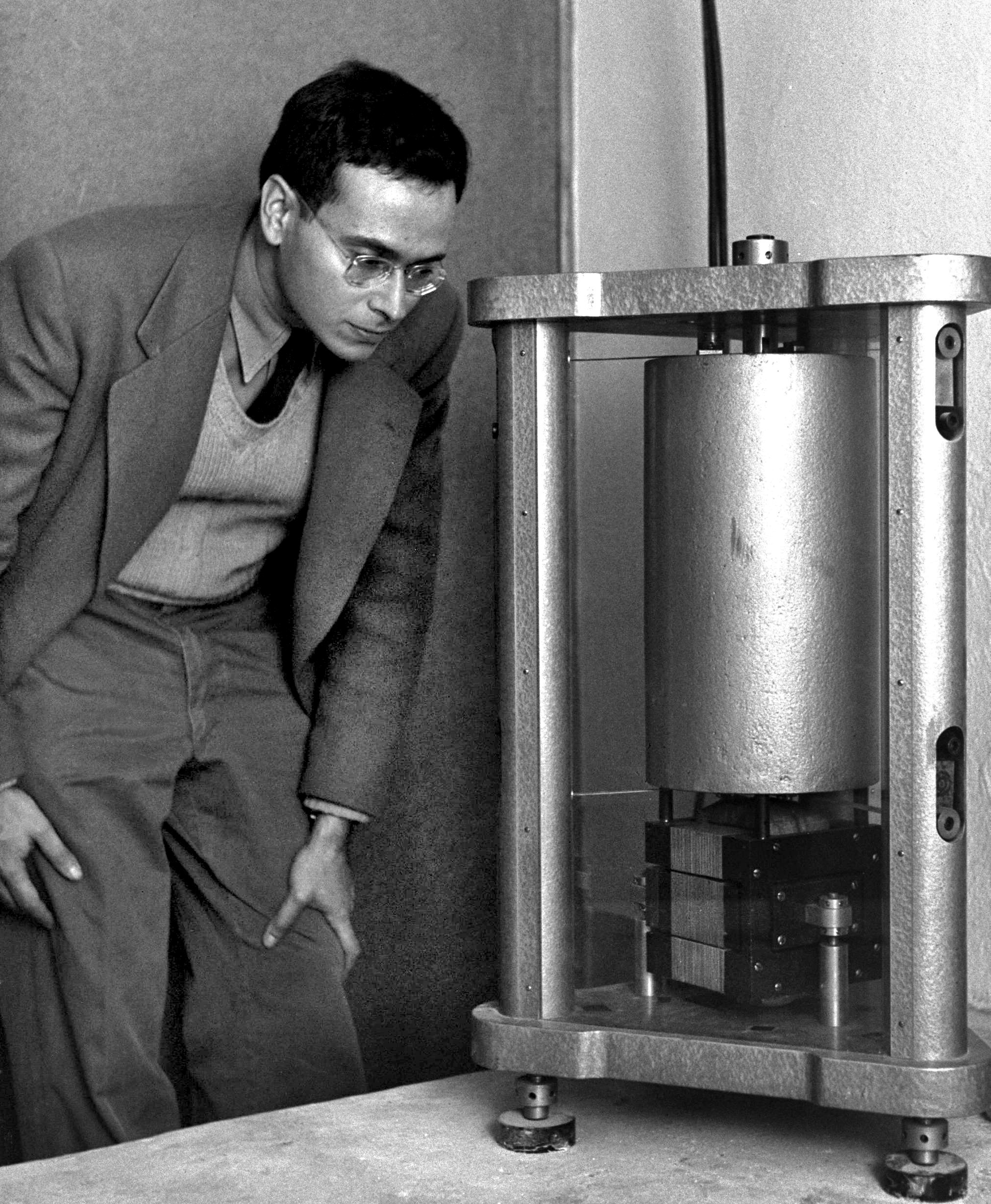
Frank Press, Jerusalem 1953

- Luigi Palmieri (Italian, 1807–1896) – seismic studies of Mount Vesuvius
- Eugene Parker (American, 1927–2022) – solar wind and magnetospheres of the Earth and Sun; awarded Kyoto Prize, National Medal of Science, William Bowie Medal
- Antares Parvulescu (American, 1923–1998) – inventor of the first time-reversal experiment, and matched equivalent-space signal (MESS) processing.
- Blaise Pascal (French, 1623–1662) – demonstrated that atmospheric pressure decreases with altitude
- Chaim Leib Pekeris (American, 1908–1993) – mathematical methods to study free vibrations of Earth, tides, and origin of Earth's magnetic field; Vetlesen Prize
- William Richard Peltier (Canadian, 1943– ) – geophysical fluid dynamics, glacial rebound, climate change, Vetlesen Prize
- Petrus Peregrinus de Maricourt (French, 13th century) – wrote the first extant treatise describing the properties of magnets and the earliest detailed discussion of freely pivoting compass needles
- Pierre Perrault (1608–1680) – developed the concept of the hydrological cycle
- Alexis Perrey (French, 1807–1882) – seismologist
- Walter C. Pitman, III (American, 1931–2019) – seafloor spreading and tectonics
- George W. Platzman (American, 1920–2008) – geophysical fluid dynamics, numerical weather prediction
- John Henry Pratt (British, 1809–1871) – laid foundation for principle of isostasy
- Frank Press (American, 1924–2020) – design of a long-period seismograph, and the first detection of the Earth's normal modes of oscillation; Maurice Ewing Medal (SEG)
- Albert Thomas Price (British, 1903–1978) – geomagnetism and global electromagnetic induction

== R ==
- Harry Fielding Reid (American, 1859–1944) – elastic-rebound theory and other contributions to seismology
- Roger Revelle (American, 1909–1991) – global warming and plate tectonics; awarded William Bowie Medal
- Charles Francis Richter (American, 1900–1985) – creation of Richter magnitude scale
- Ted Ringwood (Australian, 1930–1993) – mineral physics; awarded William Bowie Medal and Wollaston Medal
- Enders Robinson (American, 1928– ) – exploration geophysicist; co-inventor of digital seismic signal processing; Maurice Ewing Medal (SEG)
- Ignacio Rodriguez-Iturbe (Venezuelan, 1942– ) – global warming; awarded William Bowie Medal
- Keith Runcorn (British, 1922–1995) – paleomagnetic work supporting continental drift; apparent polar wander

== S ==
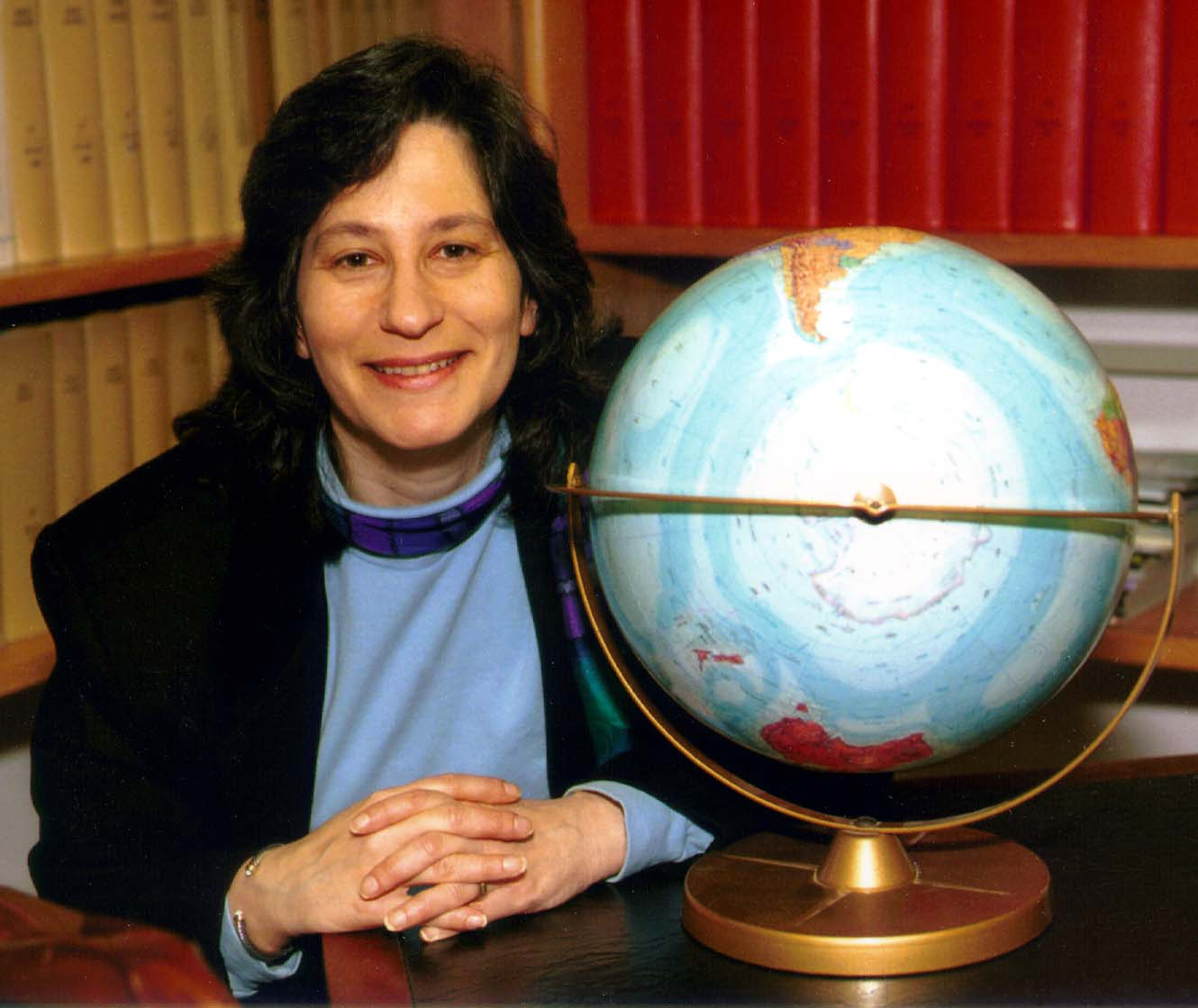
Susan Solomon

- Edward Sabine (Irish, 1788–1883) – measured oblateness of the Earth; established system of magnetic observatories
- Benjamin D. Santer (American, 1955– ) – climatologist
- Conrad Schlumberger (French, 1878–1936) – and Marcel Schlumberger (French, 1884–1953) – invented electric well logging
- Michael Schoenberg (American, 1939–2008) – contributions to seismic anisotropy
- Alessandro Serpieri (Italian, 1823–1885) – seismologist
- Nicholas Shackleton (British, 1937–2006) – paleoceanography, climate, Crafoord Prize, Vetlesen Prize
- Irwin I. Shapiro (American, 1929– ) – awarded William Bowie Medal
- Otto Schmidt (Russian, 1891–1956)
- Shen Kuo (Chinese, 1031–1095) – discovered magnetic declination
- Robert E. Sheriff (American, 1922–2014) – exploration geophysics; Maurice Ewing Medal (SEG)
- John Sherwood (British) – exploration geophysics; Maurice Ewing Medal (SEG)
- Eugene Merle Shoemaker (American, 1928–1997) – planetary science; awarded William Bowie Medal
- Paul G. Silver (American, 1948–2009) – seismic anisotropy and splitting of shear waves
- Fred Singer (Austrian-American, 1924–2020) – atmospheric physicist, global warming denier
- Susan Solomon (American, 1956– ) – proposed chlorofluorocarbons as the cause of the Antarctic ozone hole; awarded Nobel Peace Prize and William Bowie Medal
- David J. Stevenson (New Zealander/American, 1948– ) – theories of internal structure and evolution of planets
- Balfour Stewart (Scottish, 1828–1887) – observations of solar flares and geomagnetic storms
- Henry Stommel (American, 1920–1992) – ocean circulation; awarded William Bowie Medal
- David Strangway (Canadian, 1934–2016) – lunar geophysics; university administration; Maurice Ewing Medal (SEG)
- Carl Størmer (Norwegian, 1874–1957) – motion of charged particles in the magnetosphere and origin of the aurora
- Harald Sverdrup (Norwegian, 1888–1957) – ocean circulation; awarded William Bowie Medal
- Lynn Sykes (American, 1937– ) - seismologist, provided evidence for plate tectonics, and validation of the nuclear test ban treaty; awarded Vetlesen Prize

== T ==
- Albert Tarantola (Spanish, 1949–2009) – geophysical inverse problems; Maurice Ewing Medal (SEG)
- Pierre Tardi (French, 1897–1972) – geodesist and geophysicist
- Marie Tharp (1920–2006) – American geologist and oceanographic cartographer who, in partnership with Bruce Heezen, created the first scientific map of the Atlantic Ocean floor.
- Andrey Nikolayevich Tikhonov (Russian, 1906–1993) – magnetotellurics method in geophysics
- Nafi Toksöz (Turkish-American, 1937– ) – exploration geophysics; Maurice Ewing Medal (SEG)
- Sven Treitel (American-Argentine, 1929–2024) – exploration geophysicist; co-inventor of digital seismic signal processing; Maurice Ewing Medal (SEG)
- Merle Tuve (American, 1901–1982) – used radio waves to measure the ionosphere; United States Medal for Merit
- Donald L. Turcotte (American, 1932– ) – developed theory of convection in the Earth's mantle, applications of fractals and chaos to Earth processes; William Bowie Medal of the AGU

== V ==
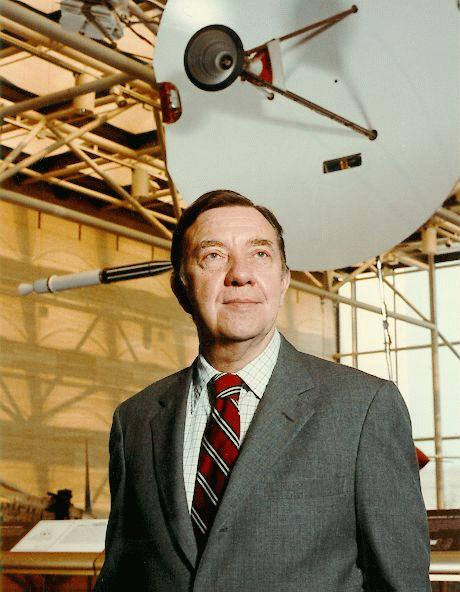
James van Allen

- James Van Allen (American, 1914–2006) – Van Allen radiation belts; awarded Crafoord Prize, Gold Medal of the Royal Astronomical Society (for geophysics), National Medal of Science, William Bowie Medal
- Petr Vaníček (Czech Canadian, 1935– ) – breakthroughs in theory of spectral analysis and geoid computation, awarded J. Tuzo Wilson Medal, founded Canadian Geophysical Union
- T. Wayland Vaughan (American, 1870–1952) – study of corals and coral reefs, larger foraminifera, and oceanography
- Fred Vine (British, 1939– ) – work on marine magnetic anomalies confirmed the theory of seafloor spreading

== W ==
- Kiyoo Wadati (Japanese, 1902–1995) – researched subduction zone earthquakes; lent name to Wadati–Benioff zone
- Alfred Wegener (German, 1880–1930) – developed theory of continental drift
- Frank T. M. White (Australian, 1909–1971) – mining and metallurgical engineer; mineral science educator
- Emil Johann Wiechert (German, 1861–1928) – first verifiable model of layered structure of the Earth; pioneering work on propagation of seismic waves
- J. Tuzo Wilson (Canadian, 1908–1993) – contributions to plate tectonics: theories of hotspots, transform faults and Wilson cycles; Vetlesen Prize; Maurice Ewing Medal (SEG); President of AGU;
- J. Lamar Worzel (American, 1919–2008) – contributions to underwater acoustics, underwater photography, and gravity measurements at sea
- Carl Wunsch (American, 1941– ) – ocean circulation, climatology; awarded the William Bowie Medal

== Z ==
- Zhang Heng (Chinese, 78–139) – invented the first seismoscope

== See also ==
- List of geodesists
- List of geologists
- List of physicists
- List of presidents of the American Geophysical Union
