= Price Medal =

- Awarded for: Excellence in geophysics, oceanography, or planetary sciences
- Sponsored by: Royal Astronomical Society
- Country: United Kingdom
- Website: https://www.ras.org.uk/awards-and-grants/awards/2280-price-medal

The Price Medal is an award of the Royal Astronomical Society for investigations of outstanding merit in solid-earth geophysics, oceanography, or planetary sciences. The medal is named after Albert Thomas Price. It was first awarded in 1994 and was initially given every three years. In 2005 this switched to every two years, and from 2014 it has been awarded every year.

== List of Price Medalists ==
Source: Royal Astronomical Society (unless otherwise noted)

- 1994 J.A. Jacobs
- 1997 Catherine Constable
- 2000 Jean-Louis Le Mouël
- 2003 Y. Kaminde
- 2005 Gillian Foulger
- 2007 Andrew Jackson
- 2009 Malcolm Sambridge
- 2011 Roger Searle
- 2013 Kathryn Whaler
- 2014 Seth Stein
- 2015 John Brodholt
- 2016 John Tarduno
- 2017 Richard Holme
- 2018 Stuart Crampin
- 2019 Catherine Johnson
- 2020 Phil Livermore
- 2021 Emily Brodsky
- 2022 Hrvoje Tkalcic
- 2023 Rhian Jones
- 2024 Chris Davies

== See also ==
- List of astronomy awards
- List of geophysicists
- List of geophysics awards
- List of prizes named after people
