= Stuart Crampin =

Stuart Crampin (October 23, 1935– May 3, 2024) was a British seismologist. He worked at the University of London and the University of Cambridge. He won a Price Medal and a Virgil Kaufmann Gold Medal from the Society of Exploration Geophysicists. Crampin was a fellow of the Royal Society of Edinburgh and worked at the British Geological Survey.
