= Catherine Johnson (scientist) =

Planetary scientist

Catherine Louise Johnson
- Education: University of California, San Diego
- Scientific career
- Workplaces: Planetary Science Institute; University of British Columbia
- Thesis: The geomagnetic field over the last 5 myr from lava flows, and properties of the Venusian lithosphere from Magellan data (1994)

Catherine L. Johnson is a planetary scientist known for her research on the magnetic fields of planets including Mercury, Venus, Earth and its moon, and Mars. In 2023, she was elected to the National Academy of Sciences.

== Education and career ==
Johnson has B.Sc. from the University of Edinburgh (1989), and earned a Ph.D. in geophysics from Scripps Institution of Oceanography, University of California, San Diego in 1994. Following her Ph.D., she was a postdoctoral researcher at Carnegie Institution for Science until 1997, at which point she joined the IRIS Consortium where she worked until 2001. From 2001 until 2006, she worked at Scripps Institution of Oceanography and then she moved to the University of British Columbia. In 2010, she joined the Planetary Science Institute.

In 2013, Johnson was elected a fellow of the American Geophysical Union who cited her "for significant contributions to understanding the magnetic fields and interior structures of the Moon and terrestrial planets".

From 2019 until 2020, Johnson was the president Geomagnetism, Paleomagnetism and Electromagnetism section at the American Geophysical Union.

== Research ==
Johnson is known for her research on magnetic fields of planets, and how they change over time. She uses chemical signals stored in lava flows to track changes in Earth's magnetic field, which includes lava flows sampled in locations such as the Azores. Her research on Mercury used the MESSENGER space probe to make observations of Mercury's magnetic field. On Mars, Johnson tracks variability in Mars' magnetic field over time and uses the Mars Orbiter Laser Altimeter to track the topography of Mars' northern polar cap. Johnson's research on Mars uses first magnetic sensor placed on Mars, part of the InSight lander, to reveal small scale details about Mars' magnetic field which was stronger than expected based on previous measurements using satellite data. Johnson is the only Canadian involved in the InSight mission, which is led by the United States' National Aeronautic and Space Administration (NASA).

=== Selected publications ===
- Smith, David E.; Zuber, Maria T.; Frey, Herbert V.; Garvin, James B.; Head, James W.; Muhleman, Duane O.; Pettengill, Gordon H.; Phillips, Roger J.; Solomon, Sean C.; Zwally, H. Jay; Banerdt, W. Bruce; Duxbury, Thomas C.; Golombek, Matthew P.; Lemoine, Frank G.; Neumann, Gregory A.; Rowlands, David D.; Aharonson, Oded; Ford, Peter G.; Ivanov, Anton B.; Johnson, Catherine L.; McGovern, Patrick J.; Abshire, James B.; Afzal, Robert S.; Sun, Xiaoli (25 October 2001). "Mars Orbiter Laser Altimeter: Experiment summary after the first year of global mapping of Mars". Journal of Geophysical Research: Planets. 106 (E10): 23689–23722. Bibcode:2001JGR...10623689S. doi:10.1029/2000JE001364.
- Johnson, C. L.; Constable, C. G.; Tauxe, L.; Barendregt, R.; Brown, L. L.; Coe, R. S.; Layer, P.; Mejia, V.; Opdyke, N. D.; Singer, B. S.; Staudigel, H.; Stone, D. B. (April 2008). "Recent investigations of the 0-5 Ma geomagnetic field recorded by lava flows: THE 0-5 Ma GEOMAGNETIC FIELD FROM LAVAS". Geochemistry, Geophysics, Geosystems. 9 (4): n/a. doi:10.1029/2007GC001696.
- Johnson, Catherine L.; Constable, Catherine G. (December 1997). "The time-averaged geomagnetic field: global and regional biases for 0-5 Ma". Geophysical Journal International. 131 (3): 643–666. Bibcode:1997GeoJI.131..643J. doi:10.1111/j.1365-246X.1997.tb06604.x.
- Johnson, Catherine L.; Wijbrans, Jan R.; Constable, Catherine G.; Gee, Jeff; Staudigel, Hubert; Tauxe, Lisa; Forjaz, Victor-H.; Salgueiro, Mário (August 1998). "40Ar/39Ar ages and paleomagnetism of São Miguel lavas, Azores". Earth and Planetary Science Letters. 160 (3–4): 637–649. Bibcode:1998E&PSL.160..637J. doi:10.1016/S0012-821X(98)00117-4.
- Johnson, Catherine L.; Purucker, Michael E.; Korth, Haje; Anderson, Brian J.; Winslow, Reka M.; Al Asad, Manar M. H.; Slavin, James A.; Alexeev, Igor. I.; Phillips, Roger J.; Zuber, Maria T.; Solomon, Sean C. (December 2012). "MESSENGER observations of Mercury's magnetic field structure: MERCURY'S MAGNETIC FIELD STRUCTURE". Journal of Geophysical Research: Planets. 117 (E12): n/a. doi:10.1029/2012JE004217. hdl:2027.42/96229. S2CID 15704254.

== Awards and honors ==
- Fellow, American Geophysical Union (2013)
- Edward Bullard lecture, American Geophysical Union (2014)
- Price Medal, Royal Astronomical Society (2019)
