= Yosuke Kamide =

Yosuke Kamide (1943–2021) was a Japanese physicist. He co-founded the Asia Oceania Geosciences Society and served as vice-president of the International Association of Geomagnetism and Aeronomy from 2003 to 2007. He was a fellow of the American Geophysical Union and the Japan Geoscience Union. He won a Price Medal from the Royal Astronomical Society. He taught at Nagoya University.
