= Catherine Constable =

Australian earth scientist

Catherine G. Constable
- Education: University of Western Australia; Australian National University; Scripps Institution of Oceanography
- Scientific career
- Workplaces: Scripps Institution of Oceanography
- Thesis: Some statistical aspects of the geomagnetic field (1989)

Catherine G. Constable is an Australian Earth scientist who is a professor at the Scripps Institution of Oceanography. Her research considers palaeo- and geo-magnetism. Constable was awarded the American Geophysical Union William Gilbert Award in 2013 and elected Fellow of the American Association for the Advancement of Science in 2017.

== Early life and education ==
Constable was born in St Andrews. At the age of eleven her family moved to Australia. She completed her high school education in Perth and attended the University of Western Australia for her undergraduate studies. As a graduate student, Constable moved to the Australian National University. Her master's dissertation investigated the variations in holocene geomagnetism in Queensland. She was a doctoral researcher at the Scripps Institution of Oceanography, where she continued to study geomagnetism and focussed on statistical analysis.

== Research and career ==
Constable was appointed to the faculty at the Scripps Institution of Oceanography after completing her doctoral degree, where she was eventually made a Professor of Geophysics. She has continued to study the time variation of geomagnetic fields and how these dynamical processes impact the deep interior of planet Earth.

== Academic service ==
From 2006 to 2009, Constable was Head of the Earth Section at the Scripps Institution of Oceanography. In 2009, she was made Deputy Director for Research and Associate Vice Chancellor for Marine Sciences. Alongside her work at the Scripps Institution, Constable held various positions of leadership at the American Geophysical Union. She oversaw the geomagnetism and paleomagnetism (GP) communities. Constable was involved with the Future Focus Task Force of the AGU and contributed to the Mission Alignment Project (MAP). She was elected to the Board of Directors of the AGU in 2013.

== Awards and honours ==
- 1997 Royal Astronomical Society Price Medal for Geomagnetism
- 1999 Elected Fellow of the American Geophysical Union
- 2004 National Science Foundation Antarctica Service Medal
- 2013 American Geophysical Union William Gilbert Award
- 2017 Elected Fellow of the American Association for the Advancement of Science

== Selected publications ==
- Steven C. Constable; Robert L. Parker; Catherine G. Constable (March 1987). "Occam's inversion: A practical algorithm for generating smooth models from electromagnetic sounding data". Geophysics. 52 (3): 289–300. Bibcode:1987Geop...52..289C. doi:10.1190/1.1442303. ISSN 0016-8033. Wikidata Q104537954.
- M. Korte; F. Donadini; C. G. Constable (June 2009). "Geomagnetic field for 0-3 ka: 2. A new series of time-varying global models". Geochemistry. 10 (6). Bibcode:2009GGG....10.6008K. doi:10.1029/2008gc002297. ISSN 1525-2027. Wikidata Q60616830.
- Monika Korte; Catherine Constable; Fabio Donadini; Richard Holme (December 2011). "Reconstructing the Holocene geomagnetic field". Earth and Planetary Science Letters. 312 (3–4): 497–505. Bibcode:2011E&PSL.312..497K. doi:10.1016/j.epsl.2011.10.031. ISSN 0012-821X. Wikidata Q57886261.
- Johnson, C. L.; Constable, C. G.; Tauxe, L.; Barendregt, R.; Brown, L. L.; Coe, R. S.; Layer, P.; Mejia, V.; Opdyke, N. D.; Singer, B. S.; Staudigel, H.; Stone, D. B. (April 2008). "Recent investigations of the 0-5 Ma geomagnetic field recorded by lava flows: THE 0-5 Ma GEOMAGNETIC FIELD FROM LAVAS". Geochemistry, Geophysics, Geosystems. 9 (4): n/a. doi:10.1029/2007GC001696.

== Personal life ==
Constable is married to geophysicist Steven Constable.
