= Malcolm Sambridge =

Australian geophysicist

Malcolm Sambridge is an Australian geophysicist. He is a fellow of the American Geophysical Union and the Australian Academy of Science. He won a Price Medal from the Royal Astronomical Society and a Beno Gutenberg Medal from the European Geosciences Union. According to the Australian Academy of Science, Sambridge's work has "reshaped the interpretation of seismic waves, landscape evolution and mineral analysis through innovative nonlinear inference methods".
