= Gillian Foulger =

British geologist and academic

- Born: 1952 (age 73–74); Ipswich
- Education: University of Cambridge; University of Durham
- Awards: Price Medal (2005)
- Scientific career
- Thesis: Seismological studies at the Hengill geothermal area, S.W. Iceland (1984)
- Doctoral advisor: Páll Einarsson; R. E. Long
- Website: community.dur.ac.uk/g.r.foulger/

Gillian Rose Foulger is a British geologist and academic born in 1952 in Ipswich. Foulger plays a major role in coordinating the global debate in the category of Earth Science, on whether or not deep mantle thermal plumes exist and create “hot spot” volcanism.

== Biography ==
Foulger is a professor of Geophysics at Durham University, where she completed her doctorate in 1985 and her Master of Science in Geophysics degree in 1976. She also received an M.A in 1978 and a B.A in Natural Sciences in 1974 both from the University of Cambridge. She is one of the leading proponents of alternative models, such as plate theory, to the established deep mantle thermal plume hypothesis. Foulger is a Managing Editor of Earth-Science Reviews; Scientific Reports Journal, a journal that publishes review articles of Earth Sciences.

=== Hot spots and mantle plumes ===
Challenging the mantle plume hypothesis, Foulger has posited that there is no chemical or isotopic data that require deep-plume origins nor are there anomalously elevated temperatures indicating the existence of such. She further claims that reliable seismic-tomography results have yet to reveal concrete evidence of a plume. Plumes, in her estimation, cannot therefore account for the eruption rates of the largest flood basalts, which she suggests could be explained alternatively by rapidly draining reservoirs of molten rock that have accumulated over time. Her research represents significant progress in developing an alternative model for anomalous volcanism. This phenomenon, she has suggested, can be better explained as a passive reaction to the stretching of lithospheric plates — such as in rift valleys — which allows melt to rise from shallow depths in the mantle. This work makes for an important contribution to the understanding of volcanic and earthquake areas such as the Hawaii, Iceland and Yellowstone hotspots.

Foulger has suggested that, regarding the mantle plume controversy in Earth Science, the fundamental reasons for the ongoing developments of this controversy are firstly, that many observations conflict with the predictions of the original model. Secondly, that it is possible that the sort of convection necessary to generate thermal plumes in the Earth's mantle does not occur. Thirdly, that so many variants of the original model have been invoked to accommodate what she describes as conflicting data, that the plume hypothesis is in practice no longer testable; finally, that alternative models are viable, though she suggests that these alternatives have been largely neglected by researchers. These factors according to Foulger are as follows:

=== Time-dependent seismic topography of the Coso geothermal area ===
From 1996 to 2004 Gillian Foulger, along with others such as Bruce Julian, Keith Richards-Dinger, and Francis Monastero monitored seismic activity using the arrival times of the U.S. Navy's seismometer network in the Coso Volcanic Field's geothermal area in California, in order to calculate the local-earthquake topography images. The Coso geothermal area in which this project takes place is used by to produce ~250 megawatts of electricity. This project, created through the collaboration of the United States Geological Survey, the U.S Navy and the University of Utah, as well as funds from the United States Department of Energy has created a set of data in which numerous other studies have the potential to be produced. Foulger has used this ~80,000-earthquake dataset to analyze time-dependent seismic tomography, relative event relocations and moment-tensor analysis and aid in developing energy production strategies.

=== Icelandia - a submerged continent ===
In June 2021, Foulger reported that under her leadership experts from the Department of Earth Sciences at Durham University believed they had discovered a submerged continent stretching from Greenland to Europe. They have given it the name "Icelandia". The theory is described in a chapter titled "Icelandia" in the publication In the Footsteps of Warren B. Hamilton: New Ideas in Earth Science.

== Awards and honours ==
- 1993, Nuffield Foundation fellow.
- 2001, Sir James Knott research Fellow.
- 2005, Foulger was made a Fellow of the Icelandic National Academy of Sciences.
- 2005, awarded the Price Medal for her work in "for investigations of outstanding merit in solid-earth geophysics, oceanography, or planetary sciences" of the Royal Astronomical Society.
- 2015, Fellow of the Geological Society of America.
- 2020, Foulger was awarded the Leopold Von Buch Badge by the German Geological Society for her research in earthquake seismology and plate tectonics, in which her research also confronted long held assumptions of the way mantles work and how volcanoes were formed.

== Society memberships ==
Foulger is a member of 6 different scientific societies; she is a Fellow of the Icelandic National Academy of Sciences, Fellow of the Royal Astronomical Society, a member of the American Geophysical Union, a Fellow of the Geological Society of America, a member of the Society of Exploration Geophysicists, and a member of the International Association of Geodesy.

== Selected publications ==
- Thatcher, Wayne; Foulger, G. R.; Julian, B. R.; Svarc, J.; Quilty, E.; Bawden, G. W. (12 March 1999). "Present-Day Deformation Across the Basin and Range Province, Western United States". Science. 283 (5408): 1714–1718. Bibcode:1999Sci...283.1714T. doi:10.1126/science.283.5408.1714. PMID 10073932.
- Foulger, G.R. (2005). Plates, Plumes, And Paradigms. Geological Society of America. p. 881. ISBN 0-8137-2388-4.
- Foulger, G.R. (2007). Plates, Plumes, and Planetary Processes. Geological Society of America. p. 998. ISBN 978-0-8137-2430-0.
- Foulger, G.R. (2010). Plates vs. Plumes: A Geological Controversy. Wiley-Blackwell. p. 364. ISBN 978-1-4051-6148-0. Archived from the original on 25 November 2017.
