= Hrvoje Tkalčić =

Australian-Croatian geophysicist

- Photo of Hrvoje Tkalčić by Brian L.N. Kennett
- Born: 3 February 1970 (age 56); Bjelovar, Republic of Croatia
- Citizenship: Croatian; Australian
- Education: University of Zagreb; University of California, Berkeley
- Known for: Seismology; Mathematical Geophysics; Inner Core; Seismic analysis Mantle (geology); Lithosphere
- Scientific career
- Fields: Earth science, geophysics, seismology
- Workplaces: Australian National University

Hrvoje Tkalčić FAA (English pronunciation: hur-VOY-eh tuh-KAL-cheech) (born 3 February 1970) is an Australian and Croatian geophysicist and Professor E2 at the Australian National University in Canberra.

== Biography ==
Hrvoje Tkalčić studied physics and geophysics at the University of Zagreb (Faculty of Science), from which he gained a Diploma of Engineering in Physics degree (speciality in Geophysics with meteorology) in 1996. He continued his postgraduate study at the University of California at Berkeley in the Department of Earth and Planetary Science, and defended a PhD thesis entitled Study of deep Earth structure using seismic body waves in 2001. He was employed as a research assistant at the UC Berkeley Seismological Laboratory (1997–2001), as a postdoctoral fellow at the Institute of Geophysics and Planetary Physics of the University of California San Diego (2002–2003), and as a postdoctoral researcher at Lawrence Livermore National Laboratory in Livermore, California (2003–2006). In 2006, he began a continuing position as Scientist in the Seismology group at Multimax, Inc., in Emeryville, California. From January 2007 until April 2013, he was a Fellow at the Research School of Earth Sciences (RSES) of the Australian National University (ANU), Canberra, Australia. From April 2013 until December 2018, he was a Senior Fellow and associate professor in Seismology and Mathematical Geophysics at RSES, ANU. He was Head of Seismology and Mathematical Geophysics from January 2017 to April 2021 and Professor E1 from January 2019 to June 2023. He has been Head of the Geophysics Area since April 2021 and Professor E2 since June 2023.

He has published 130 papers in peer-review journals in the field of seismology and mathematical geophysics, and an academic book on the Earth's inner core. His primary research interests involve studying Earth's structure and dynamics using state-of-the-art seismological techniques, with the main focus on the Earth's core and the lowermost mantle, and developing new techniques for imaging Earth's interior, including both seismic and correlation wavefield. Other interests include studying the physics of tectonic and volcanic earthquakes by means of waveform modelling and improving volumetric raypath coverage of the Earth's interior through the installation of seismic instruments in remote parts of the planet, including on the ocean bottom.

He participated in a number of scientific field campaigns to establish temporary seismic networks in remote parts of Australia and the Southern Ocean. The main objective has been to image the structure of the Earth's interior using seismic tomography and other imaging techniques. He actively participates in special sessions at a number of international geophysical conferences. He is a member of the American Geophysical Union and Seismological Society of America, a Fellow of the Japan Society for the Promotion of Science, and a Fellow of the Royal Astronomical Society, London. He was elected a Fellow of the American Geophysical Union and a Fellow of the Australian Academy of Science. He has been serving on the editorial board of the journals Physics of the Earth and Planetary Interiors, Scientific Reports and Geofizika. He was a member of the Australian Research Council College of Experts and New Zealand Ministry of Business, Innovation and Employment College of Assessors and on the committees of the American Geophysical Union and the Australian Academy of Science. He is Director of Warramunga Seismic and Infrasound Research Station in Northern Territory, Australia. In 2025, he was awarded an Australian Laureate Fellowship for the program "Echoes from the planetary cores".

== Academic honours ==
- 1997 – The Perry Byerly Graduate Fellowship in Seismology, UC Berkeley
- 2002 – Outstanding Student Paper Award by American Geophysical Union
- 2010/2011 – Fellow of the Japan Society for the Promotion of Science (JSPS)
- 2016 – Excellence in Research Achievement Award by AuScope
- 2020 – Elected Fellow of the American Geophysical Union
- 2022 – Vice Chancellor's Award for Excellence in Supervision, Australian National University
- 2022 – Price Medal of the Royal Astronomical Society
- 2023 – Distinguished Scientist of the Chinese Academy of Sciences President's International Fellowship Initiative
- 2024 – Honorary Doctorate (Doctor Honoris Causa) University of Zagreb
- 2024 – Elected a Fellow of the Australian Academy of Science
- 2025 – Australian Laureate Fellowship

== Books ==
- Tkalčić, H.: The Earth's Inner Core Revealed by Observational Seismology, Cambridge (UK): Cambridge University Press, 2017. ISBN 9781139583954
- Tkalčić, H.: "Potresi: divovi koji se ponekad bude", Zagreb: Naklada Ljevak, 2022. ISBN 978-953-355-597-3
- Tkalčić, H.: When Worlds Quake: The Quest to Understand the Interior of Earth and Beyond, Princeton, Oxford, Beijing: Princeton University Press, 2026. ISBN 9780691271477
