= Plate theory (volcanism) =

Model of volcanic activities on Earth

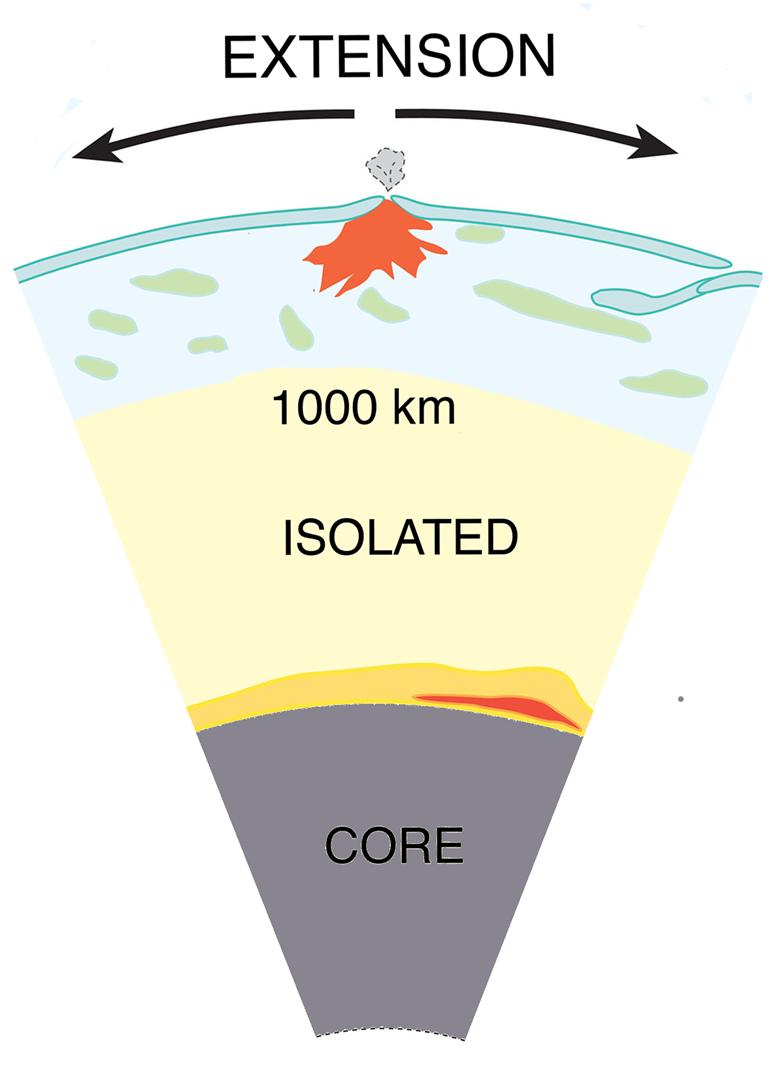
Schematic of the plate theory. Mid-blue: lithosphere; light-blue/green: inhomogeneous upper mantle; yellow: lower mantle; orange/red: core-mantle boundary. Lithospheric extension enables pre-existing melt (red) to rise.

The plate theory is a model of volcanism that attributes all volcanic activity on Earth, even that which appears superficially to be anomalous, to the operation of plate tectonics. According to the plate theory, the principal cause of volcanism is extension of the lithosphere. Extension of the lithosphere is a function of the lithospheric stress field. The global distribution of volcanic activity at a given time reflects the contemporaneous lithospheric stress field, and changes in the spatial and temporal distribution of volcanoes reflect changes in the stress field. The main factors governing the evolution of the stress field are:

1. Changes in the configuration of plate boundaries.
2. Vertical motions.
3. Thermal contraction.

Lithospheric extension enables pre-existing melt in the crust and mantle to escape to the surface. If extension is severe and thins the lithosphere to the extent that the asthenosphere rises, then additional melt is produced by decompression upwelling.

== Origins of the plate theory ==
Developed during the late 1960s and 1970s, plate tectonics provided an elegant explanation for most of the Earth's volcanic activity. At spreading boundaries where plates move apart, the asthenosphere decompresses and melts to form new oceanic crust. At subduction zones, slabs of oceanic crust sink into the mantle, dehydrate, and release volatiles which lower the melting temperature and give rise to volcanic arcs and back-arc extensions. Several volcanic provinces, however, do not fit into this simple picture, and have traditionally been considered exceptional cases which require a non-plate-tectonic explanation.

Just prior to the development of plate tectonics in the early 1960s, the Canadian geophysicist John Tuzo Wilson suggested that chains of volcanic islands form from movement of the seafloor over relatively stationary hotspots in stable centres of mantle convection cells. In the early 1970s, Wilson's idea was revived by the American geophysicist W. Jason Morgan. In order to account for the long-lived supply of magma that some volcanic regions seemed to require, Morgan modified the hypothesis, shifting the source to a thermal boundary layer. Because of the perceived fixity of some volcanic sources relative to the plates, he proposed that this thermal boundary was deeper than the convecting upper mantle on which the plates ride and located it at the core-mantle boundary, 3,000 km beneath the surface. He suggested that narrow convection currents rise from fixed points at this thermal boundary and form conduits, which transport abnormally hot material to the surface. This, the mantle plume theory, became the dominant explanation for apparent volcanic anomalies for the remainder of the 20th century.

Testing the plume hypothesis, however, is beset with difficulties. A central tenet of the plume theory is that the source of melt is significantly hotter than the surrounding mantle, so the most direct test is to measure the source temperature of magmas. This is difficult, as the petrogenesis of magmas is extremely complex, rendering inferences from petrology or geochemistry to source temperatures unreliable. Seismic data used to provide additional constraints on source temperatures are highly ambiguous. In addition to this, predictions of the plume theory have proved unsuccessful at many locations purported to be underlain by mantle plumes, and there are also significant theoretical reasons to doubt the hypothesis.

The foregoing issues have inspired a growing number of geoscientists, led by American geophysicist Don L. Anderson and British geophysicist Gillian R. Foulger, to pursue other explanations for volcanic activity not easily accounted for by plate tectonics. Rather than introducing another exterior theory, these explanations essentially expand the scope of plate tectonics in ways that can accommodate volcanic activity previously thought to be outside its remit. The key modification to the basic plate-tectonic model here is a relaxation of the assumption that plates are rigid. This implies that lithospheric extension occurs not only at spreading plate boundaries but throughout plate interiors, a phenomenon that is well supported both theoretically and empirically.

Over the last two decades, the plate theory has developed into a cohesive research programme, attracting many adherents, and occupying researchers in several subdisciplines of Earth science. It has also been the focus of several international conferences and many peer-reviewed papers and is the subject of two major Geological Society of America edited volumes and a textbook.

== Lithospheric extension ==
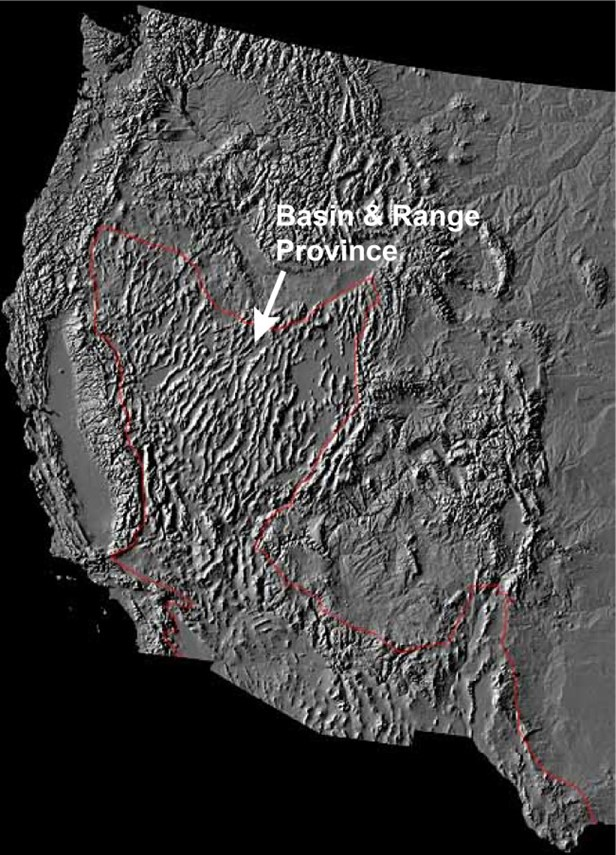
Digital terrain map of the Basin Range province of the Western USA, showing the fabric of the normal-fault-controlled, heavily extended continental crust.

Global-scale lithospheric extension is a necessary consequence of the non-closure of plate motion circuits, and is equivalent to an additional slow-spreading boundary. Extension results principally from the following three processes:

1. Changes in the configuration of plate boundaries, which can result from various processes including the formation or annihilation of plates and boundaries and slab rollback (vertical sinking of subducting slabs causing oceanward migration of trenches).
2. Vertical motions resulting from delamination of the lower crust and mantle lithosphere and isostatic adjustment following erosion, orogeny, or melting of ice caps.
3. Thermal contraction, which sums to the largest amount across large plates such as the Pacific.

Extension resulting from these processes manifests in a variety of structures including continental rift zones (e.g., the East African Rift), diffuse oceanic plate boundaries (e.g., Iceland), continental back-arc extensional regions (e.g., the Basin and Range Province in the Western United States), oceanic back-arc basins (e.g., the Manus Basin in the Bismarck Sea off Papua New Guinea), fore-arc regions (e.g., the western Pacific), and continental regions undergoing lithospheric delamination (e.g., New Zealand).

Continental breakup begins with rifting. When extension is persistent and entirely compensated by magma from asthenospheric upwelling, oceanic crust is formed, and the rift becomes a spreading plate boundary. If extension is isolated and ephemeral, it is classified as intraplate. Rifting can occur in both oceanic and continental crust, and ranges from minor to amounts approaching those seen at spreading boundaries. All forms can give rise to magmatism.

Various extensional styles are seen in the northeast Atlantic. Continental rifting began in the late Paleozoic, and was followed by catastrophic destabilisation in the late Cretaceous and early Paleocene. The latter was possibly caused by rollback of the Alpine slab, which generated extension throughout Europe. More severe rifting occurred along the Caledonian Suture, a zone of pre-existing weakness where the Iapetus Ocean closed around 420 Ma. As extension became localised, oceanic crust began to form around 54 Ma, with diffuse extension persisting around Iceland.

Some intracontinental rifts are essentially failed continental breakup axes, and some of these form triple junctions with plate boundaries. The East African Rift, for example, forms a triple junction with the Red Sea and the Gulf of Aden, both of which have progressed to the seafloor spreading stage. Likewise, the Mid-American Rift constitutes two arms of a triple junction along with a third, which separated the Amazonian Craton from Laurentia around 1.1 Ga.

Diverse volcanic activity resulting from lithospheric extension has occurred throughout the western United States. The Cascade Volcanoes are a back-arc volcanic chain extending from British Columbia to Northern California. Back-arc extension continues to the east in the Basin and Range Province, with small-scale volcanism distributed throughout the region.

The Pacific Plate is the largest tectonic plate on Earth, covering about one third of Earth's surface. It undergoes considerable extension and shear deformation due to thermal contraction of the lithosphere. Shear deformation is greatest in the area between Samoa and the Easter Microplate, an area replete with volcanic provinces such as the Cook-Austral chain, the Marquesas and Society Islands, the Tuamotu Archipelago, the Fuca and Pukapuka ridges and Pitcairn Island.

== Magma source ==
The volume of magma that is intruded and/or erupted in a given area of lithospheric extension depends on two variables: the availability of pre-existing melt in the crust and mantle, and the amount of additional melt supplied by decompression upwelling. The latter depends on three factors: lithospheric thickness, the amount of extension, and the fusibility and temperature of the source.

There is abundant pre-existing melt throughout both the crust and the mantle. In the crust, melt is stored under active volcanoes in shallow reservoirs which are fed by deeper ones. In the asthenosphere, a small amount of partial melt is thought to provide a weak layer that acts as lubrication for the movement of tectonic plates. The presence of pre-existing melt means that magmatism can occur even in areas where lithospheric extension is modest, such as the Cameroon and Pitcairn-Gambier volcanic lines.

The rate of magma formation from decompression of the asthenosphere depends on how high the asthenosphere can rise, which in turn depends on the thickness of the lithosphere. From numerical modelling, it is evident that the formation of melt in the largest flood basalts cannot be concurrent with its emplacement. This means that melt is formed over a longer period, stored in reservoirs, most likely located at the lithosphere-asthenosphere boundary, and then released by lithospheric extension. That large volumes of magma are stored at the base of the lithosphere is shown by observations of large magmatic provinces such as the Great Dyke in Zimbabwe and the Bushveld Igneous Complex in South Africa. There, thick lithosphere remained intact during large-volume magmatism, so decompression upwelling on the scale required for that activity can be ruled out, implying that large volumes of magma must have pre-existed.

If extension is severe and results in significant thinning of the lithosphere, the asthenosphere can rise to shallow depths, inducing decompression melting and producing larger volumes of melt. At mid-ocean ridges, where the lithosphere is thin, decompression upwelling produces a modest rate of magmatism. The same process can also produce small-volume magmatism on or near slowly extending continental rifts. Beneath continents, the lithosphere is up to 200 km thick. If lithosphere this thick undergoes severe and persistent extension, it can rupture, and the asthenosphere can upwell to the surface, producing tens of millions of cubic kilometres of melt along axes hundreds of kilometres long. This occurred, for example, during the opening of the North Atlantic Ocean, when the asthenosphere rose from base of the Pangaean lithosphere to the surface.

== Examples ==
The vast majority of volcanic provinces which are thought to be anomalous in the context of rigid plate tectonics can be explained using the plate theory. The type examples of this kind of volcanic activity are Iceland, Yellowstone, and Hawaii. Iceland is the type example of a volcanic anomaly situated on a plate boundary. Yellowstone, together with the Eastern Snake River Plain to its west, is the type example of an intra-continental volcanic anomaly. Hawaii, along with the related Hawaiian-Emperor seamount chain, is the type example of an intra-oceanic volcanic anomaly.

=== Iceland ===
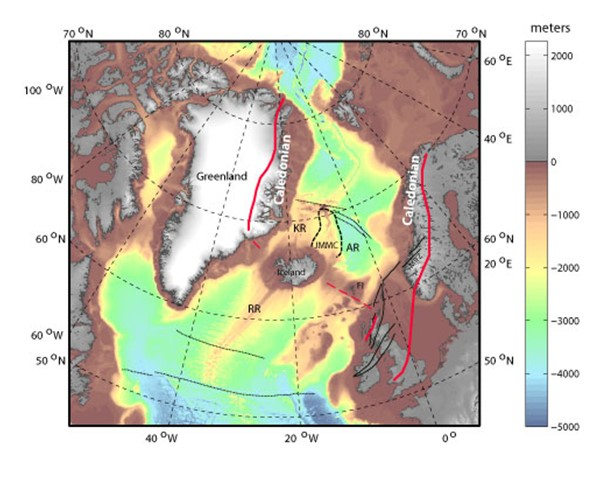
Regional map of the North East Atlantic. Bathymetry shown in colour; land topography in grey. RR: Reykjanes Ridge; KR: Kolbeinsey Ridge; JMMC: Jan Mayen Microcontinent; AR: Aegir Ridge; FI: Faroe Islands. Red lines: boundaries of the Caledonian orogen and associated thrusts, dashed where extrapolated into younger Atlantic Ocean.

Iceland is a 1 km high, 450x300 km basaltic shield on the mid-ocean ridge in the northeast Atlantic Ocean. It comprises over 100 active or extinct volcanoes, and has been extensively studied by earth scientists for several decades.

Iceland must be understood in the context of the broader structure and tectonic history of the northeast Atlantic. The northeast Atlantic formed in the early Cenozoic when, after an extensive period of rifting, Greenland separated from Eurasia as Pangaea began to break up. To the north of Iceland's present location, the breakup axis propagated south along the Caledonian Suture. To the south, the breakup axis propagated north. The two axes were separated by around 100 km from east to west and 300 km from north to south. When the two axes developed to full seafloor spreading, the 100x300 km continental region between the two rifts formed the Iceland microcontinent, which underwent diffuse extension and shear along several north-oriented rift axes, and basaltic lavas were emplaced in and on the stretched continental crust. This style of extension persists across parallel rift zones which frequently become extinct and are replaced with new ones.

This model explains several distinct characteristics of the region:

1. Persistence of a subaerial land-bridge from Greenland to the Faroe Islands, which was broken up when the northeast Atlantic was around 1,000 km wide, older parts of which now form a shallow submarine ridge.
2. The instability and decoupling of spreading ridges to the north and south. To the north, the Aegir Ridge became extinct around 31-28 Ma and extension transferred to the Kolbeinsey Ridge around 400 km to the west. In the Reykjanes Ridge to the south, after around 16 million years of spreading perpendicular to the ridge strike, the direction of extension changed, and the ridge became a ridge-transform system which later migrated eastward.
3. Properties of the crust beneath the Greenland-Iceland-Faroe Ridge. Here the crust is mostly 30–40 km thick. Its combination of low seismic wave speed and high density defy classification as thick oceanic crust, and indicate instead that it is magma-inflated continental crust. This suggests that Iceland is the result of persistent extension of continental crust, which was structurally resistant to continued propagation of the new oceanic ridges. As a result, continental extension continued for an exceptionally long period and has not yet given way to true ocean spreading. Melt production is similar to the adjacent mid-ocean ridges, which produces oceanic crust around 10 km thick, though under Iceland, rather than forming oceanic crust, melt is emplaced into and on top of stretched continental crust.
4. Iceland's unusual petrology and geochemistry, which is around 10% silicic and intermediate, with geochemistry similar to such flood basalts as Karoo and Deccan which have undergone silicic assimilation of, or contamination by, continental crust.

=== Yellowstone ===
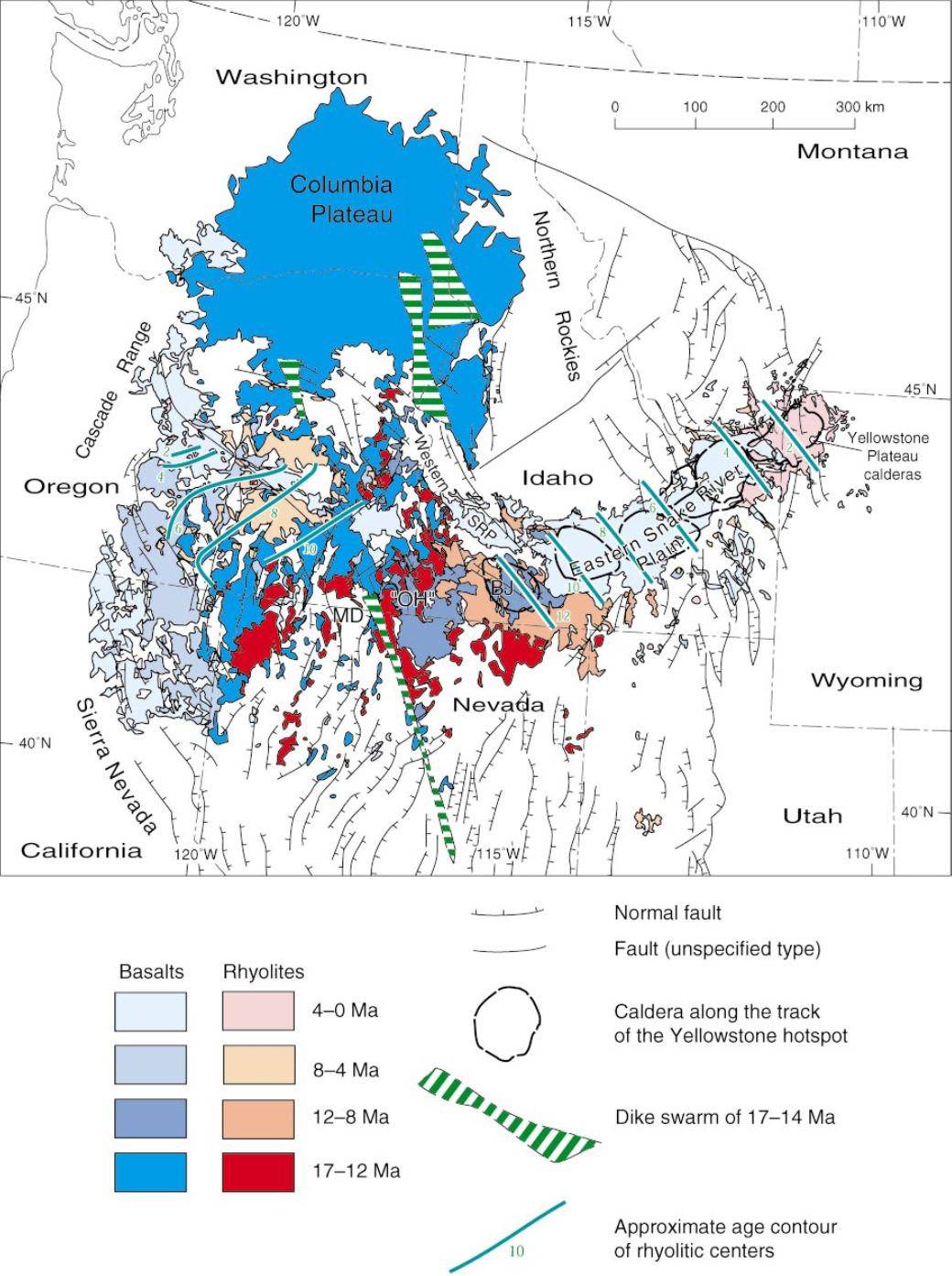
Geological map of northwest USA showing Basin and Range faults and basalts and rhyolites <17 Ma. Blue lines represent approximate age contours of silicic volcanic centres across the Eastern Snake River Plain and a contemporaneous trend of oppositely propagating silicic volcanism across central Oregon.

Yellowstone and the Eastern Snake River Plain to the west comprise a belt of large, silicic caldera volcanoes that get progressively younger to the east, culminating in the currently active Yellowstone Caldera in northwest Wyoming. The belt, however, is covered with basaltic lavas that display no time progression. Being located on a continental interior, it has been studied extensively, though research has consisted largely of seismology and geochemistry aimed at locating sources deep in the mantle. These methods are not suitable for developing a plate theory, which holds that volcanism is associated with processes at shallow depths.

As with Iceland, volcanism in the Yellowstone-Eastern Snake River Plain region must be understood in its broader tectonic context. The tectonic history of the western United States is heavily influenced by the subduction of the East Pacific Rise under the North American Plate, beginning around 17 Ma. A change in the plate boundary from subduction to shear induced extension across the western United States. This brought about widespread volcanism, beginning with the Columbia River Basalt Group which erupted through a 250-km-long zone of dikes that broadened the crust by several kilometres. The Basin and Range province then formed via normal faulting, producing scattered volcanism with especially abundant eruptions in three east–west zones: the Yellowstone-Eastern Snake River Plain, Valles, and St. George volcanic zones. Compared with the others, the Yellowstone-Eastern Snake River Plain zone is considered unusual because of its time-progressive silicic volcano chain and striking geothermal features.

The volcanoes' silicic composition indicates a lower crustal source. If volcanism resulted from lithospheric extension, then extension along the Yellowstone-Eastern Snake River Plain zone must have migrated from west to east during the last 17 million years. There is evidence that this is the case. Accelerated motion on nearby normal faults, which indicates extension in the Basin and Range province, migrates east coincidentally with migration of the silicic volcanism. This is corroborated by measurements of recent deformation from GPS surveying, which finds the most intense zones of extension in the Basin and Range province in the far east and far west and little extension in the central 500 km. The Yellowstone-Eastern Snake River Plain zone, therefore, likely reflects a locus of extension that has migrated from west to east. This is further supported by analogous extension-driven silicic magmatism elsewhere in the Western United States, for example in the Coso Hot Springs and Long Valley Caldera in California.

That persistent basaltic volcanism results from simultaneous extension along the entire length of the Yellowstone-Eastern Snake River Plain zone is evident in GPS measurements recorded between 1987 and 2003, which record extension to both the north and south of the zone. Evidence of historic extension can be found in northwest-oriented dike-fed rift zones responsible for basalt flows. Analogy with similar volcanic activity in Iceland and on mid-ocean ridges indicates that periods of extension are brief, and thus that basaltic volcanism along the Yellowstone-Eastern Snake River Plain zone occurs in short bursts of activity in between long inactive periods.

=== Hawaii ===
The Hawaii-Emperor volcanic system is notoriously difficult to study. It is thousands of kilometres from any major continental landmass and surrounded by deep ocean, very little of it is above sea level, and it is covered in thick basalt which obscures its deeper structure. It is situated within the Cretaceous Magnetic Quiet Zone, a relatively long period of normal polarity in the Earth's magnetic field, so age variations in the lithosphere are difficult to determine with accuracy. Reconstructing the tectonic history of the Pacific Ocean more generally is problematic because earlier plates and plate boundaries, including the spreading ridge where the Emperor chain began, have been subducted. Because of these issues, geoscientists have yet to produce a fully developed theory of the system's origins which can be positively tested.

Observations that must be accounted for by any such theory include:

1. Hawaii's position in almost the exact geometric centre of the Pacific Plate, at the middle point of a line dividing the western Pacific which is surrounded mainly by subduction zones and the eastern Pacific which is surrounded mainly by spreading ridges.
2. The increasing volume of melt. Over the last 50 million years, the rate of melt production has increased from a mere 0.001 km^{3} per year to 0.25 km^{3} per year, a factor of around 250. The current rate of magmatism responsible for the formation of the Big Island has been in operation for only 2 million years.
3. Non-movement of the volcanic centre relative to both the geomagnetic pole and geometry of the Pacific Plate for around 50 million years.
4. Continuity of the Hawaiian chain with the Emperor chain via a 60° "bend". The latter formed over a 30-million-year period during which the volcanic centre migrated south-southeast. Migration ceased at the beginning of the Hawaiian chain. The 60° bend cannot be accounted for by a change in plate direction because no such change occurred.

The lack of any regional heatflow anomaly detected around the extinct islands and seamounts indicates that the volcanoes are local thermal features. According to the plate theory, the Hawaiian-Emperor system formed at a region of extension in the Pacific Plate. Extension in the plate is a consequence of deformation at plate boundaries, thermal contraction, and isostatic adjustment. Extension originated at a spreading ridge around 80 Ma. The plate's stress field evolved over the next 30 million years, causing the region of extension and consequent volcanism to migrate south-southeast. Around 50 Ma, the stress field stabilised and the region of extension became almost stationary. At the same time, the north-westerly motion of the Pacific Plate increased, and over the next 50 million years, the Hawaiian chain formed as the plate moved across a near-stationary region of extension.

The increasing rate of volcanic activity in the Hawaiian-Emperor system reflects the availability of melt in the crust and mantle. The oldest volcanoes in the Emperor chain formed on young, and therefore thin, oceanic lithosphere. The size of the seamounts increases with the age of the seafloor, indicating that the availability of melt increases with the thickness of the lithosphere. This suggests that decompression melting may contribute, as this, too, is expected to increase with lithospheric thickness. The significant increase in magmatism during the last 2 million years indicates a major increase in melt availability, implying that either a larger reservoir of pre-existing melt or an exceptionally fusible source region has become available. Petrological and geochemical evidence suggests that this source may be old metamorphosed oceanic crust in the asthenosphere, highly fusible material which would produce far greater magma volumes than mantle rocks.

== Advantages of the plate theory ==
Representatives of this theory see as the major virtue of the plate theory is that it extends plate tectonics into a unifying account of the Earth's volcanism which dispenses with the need to invoke extraneous hypotheses designed to accommodate instances of volcanic activity which appear superficially to be exceptional.
