= Rhian Jones =

British planetary scientist

Rhian H. Jones (born 1960) is a British planetary scientist whose research focuses on chondrites and the evidence they provide on how the Solar System formed. She is Reader in Isotope Geo- and Cosmochemistry in the Department of Earth and Environmental Sciences at the University of Manchester.

== Education and career ==
Jones read chemistry at the University of Oxford, earning a bachelor's degree there in 1983. She completed a PhD in geology at the University of Manchester in 1986.

She went to the University of New Mexico for postdoctoral research, beginning her lifelong work on meteorites, and remained at the university as a faculty member for many years, also becoming curator of meteorites for the university's Institute of Meteoritics. In 2015, she retired from the University of New Mexico as a professor emerita, and returned to the University of Manchester as a reader.

== Recognition ==
Jones is the 2023 winner of the Price Medal of the Royal Astronomical Society, "in recognition of her outstanding contributions in a series of closely-linked investigations using chondritic meteorites to understand the composition and formation of the first planetary bodies in the Solar System".

Asteroid 5366 Rhianjones is named for her.
