= Hawaii hotspot =

Volcanic hotspot near the Hawaiian Islands, in the Pacific Ocean

Hawaiʻi hotspot
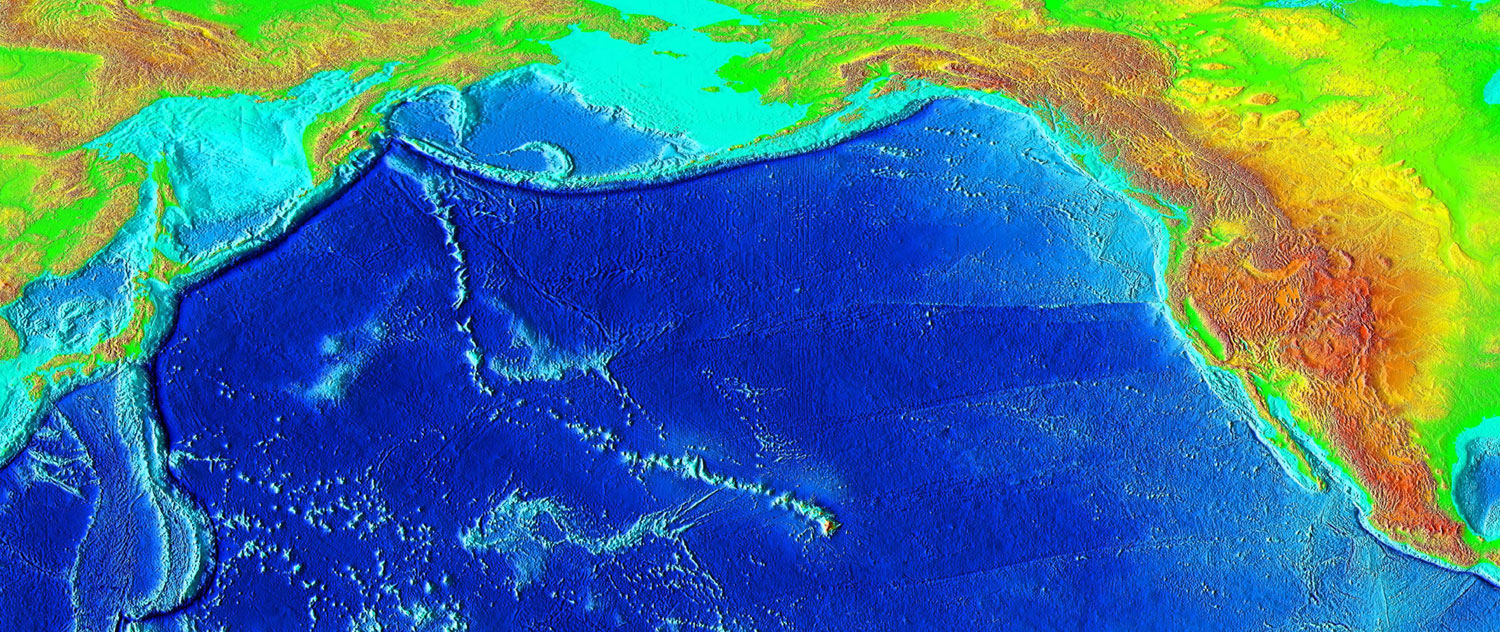
- Bathymetry of the Hawaiian–Emperor seamount chain, showing the long volcanic chain generated by the Hawaii hotspot, starting in Hawaiʻi and ending at the Aleutian Trench

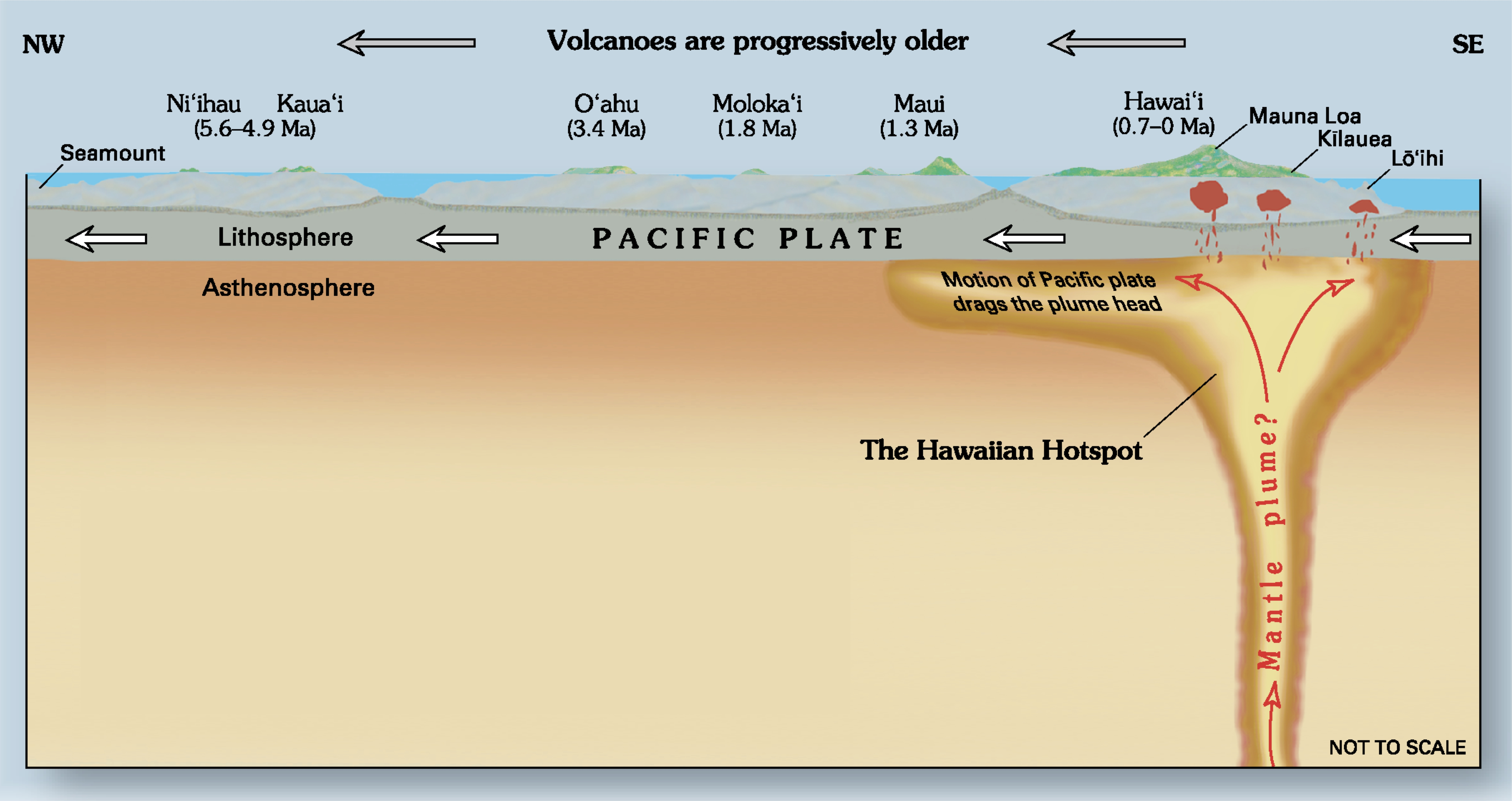
- A diagram demonstrating the migration of the Earth's crust over the hotspot
- Country: United States
- State: Hawaii
- Region: North Pacific Ocean
- Coordinates: 18.92°N 155.27°W—Kamaʻehuakanaloa Seamount (formerly Lō'ihi), actual hotspot lies about 40 km (25 mi) southeast

The Hawaiʻi hotspot is a volcanic hotspot located near the namesake Hawaiian Islands, in the northern Pacific Ocean. One of the best known and intensively studied hotspots in the world, the Hawaii plume is responsible for the creation of the Hawaiian–Emperor seamount chain, a 6,200-kilometer (3,900 mi) mostly undersea volcanic mountain range. Four of these volcanoes are active, two are dormant; more than 123 are extinct, most now preserved as atolls or seamounts. The chain extends from south of the island of Hawaiʻi to the edge of the Aleutian Trench, near the eastern coast of Russia.

While some volcanoes are created by geologic processes near tectonic plate convergence and subduction zones, the Hawaiʻi hotspot is located far from plate boundaries. The classic hotspot theory, first proposed in 1963 by John Tuzo Wilson, proposes that a single, fixed mantle plume builds volcanoes that are then cut off from their source by the movement of the Pacific plate. This causes less lava to erupt from these volcanoes and they eventually erode below sea level over millions of years. According to this theory, the nearly 60° bend in the chain was caused by a shift in the direction of movement of the Pacific Plate 47 million years ago, because of differential subduction rates, breaking off of suducting slabs, and drag forces.

In 2003, a new study proposed the mobile hotspot hypothesis, suggesting that hotspots are prone to movement instead of being fixed, and that the bend was caused by a shift in the hotspot's motion rather than the plate's. This could occur through plume drag taking parts of the plume in the direction of plate movement while the main plume could remain stationary. Many other hot spot tracks move nearly in parallel, so current thinking is a combination of these ideas.

Ancient Hawaiians were the first to recognize the increasing age and weathered state of the volcanoes to the north as they progressed on fishing expeditions along the islands. The constant battle between the sea and the Hawaiian volcanoes is a major element in Hawaiian mythology, embodied in the volcano god Pele. After the arrival of Europeans in 1880–1881 James Dwight Dana directed the first geological study of the hotspot's volcanics, formally documenting this relationship. The Hawaiian Volcano Observatory was founded in 1912 by volcanologist Thomas Jaggar, initiating continuous geological observation. In the 1970s, a mapping project was initiated to explore the complex geology of Hawaii's seafloor.

More recently, seismic tomography has found the hotspot to be 500 to 600 km (310 to 370 mi) wide and up to 2,000 km (1,200 mi) deep, and olivine and garnet-based studies have shown its magma chamber is approximately 1,500 °C (2,730 °F). In its at least 85 million years of activity, the hotspot has produced an estimated 750,000 km^{3} (180,000 mi^{3}) of rock. The chain's rate of drift has slowly increased over time, decreasing the duration of each active volcano from 18 million years for the 76-million-year-old Detroit Seamount, to just under 900,000 for the one-million-year-old Kohala; on the other hand, eruptive volume has increased from 0.01 km^{3} (0.002 mi^{3}) per year to about 0.21 km^{3} (0.050 mi^{3}). Overall, this has caused a trend towards copious, short-lived, closely spaced volcanoes such as those on Hawaiʻi Island and ancient Maui Nui, while the oldest of the northern Emperor seamounts are spaced as far as 200 km (120 mi) apart.

== Theories ==
Tectonic plates generally focus deformation and volcanism at plate boundaries. However, the Hawaii hotspot is more than 3,200 kilometers (1,988 mi) from the nearest plate boundary; while studying it in 1963, Canadian geophysicist J. Tuzo Wilson proposed the hotspot theory to explain these exceptional zones of volcanism, a theory now widely accepted.

=== Wilson's stationary hotspot theory ===
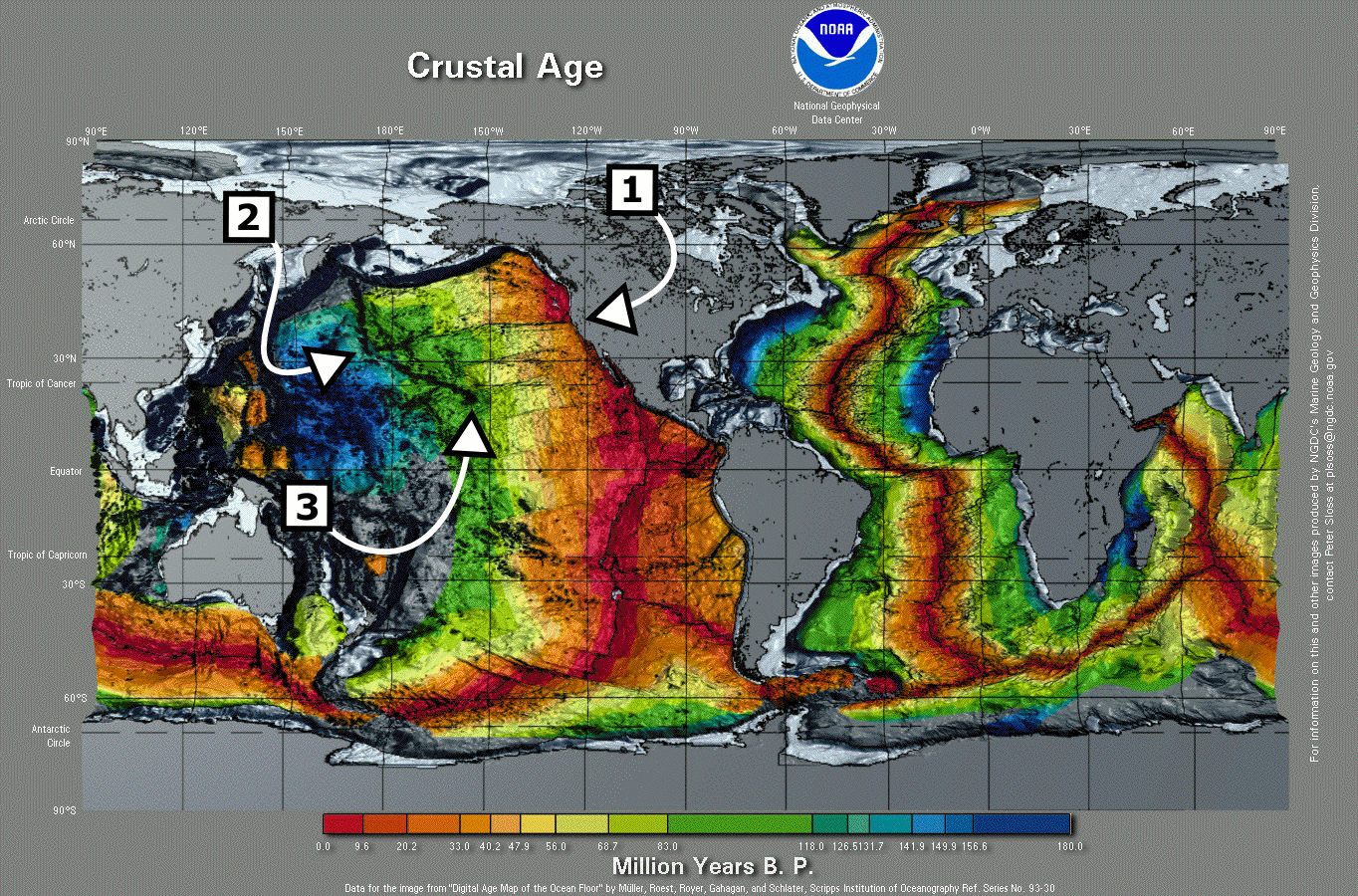
Map, color-coded from red to blue to indicate the age of crust built by seafloor spreading. 2 indicates the position of the bend in the hotspot trail, and 3 points to the present location of the Hawaiʻi hotspot.

Wilson proposed that mantle convection produces small, hot, buoyant upwellings under the Earth's surface; these mantle plumes supply magma which sustains long-lasting volcanic activity. This "mid-plate" volcanism builds peaks that rise from relatively featureless sea floor, growing from seamounts into volcanic islands. The local tectonic plate (in this case the Pacific Plate) gradually passes over the hotspot, carrying its old volcanoes along without affecting the plume underneath. Over hundreds of thousands of years, the magma supply for an individual volcano is left behind, eventually causing its extinction. No longer active enough to counter erosion, the volcano wears away beneath the waves, becoming a seamount once again. Meanwhile, the plume pierces the crust at a new volcanic center, and another volcanic island rises. This continues until the mantle plume itself ceases due to poorly-understood deep mantle dynamics.

This cycle of growth and dormancy strings along volcanoes over millions of years, leaving a trail of volcanic islands and seamounts across the ocean floor. Wilson's theory explains why the Hawaiian volcanoes are progressively older and increasingly eroded further from the hotspot: the oldest rock in the main islands, that of Kauaʻi, is about 5.5 million years old and deeply eroded, while the rock on Hawaiʻi Island is a comparatively young 0.7 million years or less, with new lava constantly erupting at Kīlauea, the hotspot's present center.

Another consequence of Wilson's theory is that the chain's length and orientation records the direction and speed of the Pacific Plate's movement. A major feature of the Hawaiian trail is a "sudden" 60-degree bend at a 40- to 50-million-year-old section of its length, implying a major change in plate direction, which would have initiated subduction along much of the plate's western boundary. This part of the theory has recently been challenged, and the bend might be attributed to the movement of the hotspot instead.

Geophysicists believe that hotspots originate at one of two major boundaries deep in the Earth, either a shallow interface in the lower mantle between an upper mantle convecting layer and a lower non-convecting layer, or a deeper D'' (D double-prime) layer approximately 200 kilometres (120 mi) thick and immediately above the core-mantle boundary. A mantle plume that would initiate melt is generated through partial melting of mantle material, reduction in melting point through addition of volatiles by subduction of hydrated slabs, and decrease in pressure due to erosional processes. This heated, buoyant, and less-viscous portion of the upper layer would become less dense due to thermal expansion, and rise towards the surface as a Rayleigh-Taylor instability. When the mantle plume reaches the base of the lithosphere, the plume melts it into magma which makes its way to the surface, where it erupts as lava.

Arguments for the validity of the hotspot theory generally center on the steady age progression of the Hawaiian islands and nearby features: a similar bend in the trail of the Macdonald hotspot, with the Austral-Marshall Islands seamount chain located just south; other Pacific hotspots following the same age-progressed trend from southeast to northwest in fixed relative positions; and seismologic studies of Hawaii which show increased temperatures at the core–mantle boundary, evidence of a deep plume.

=== Shallow hotspot hypothesis ===
Cutaway diagram of Earth's internal structure

Another hypothesis is that melting anomalies form as a result of lithospheric extension (stretching of the surface layer), which allows pre-existing melt to rise to the surface. According to this theory, though the melting anomalies are called hotspots, the mantle underlying them is not anomalously hot, only the enclosing lithosphere is thin.

The Hawaiian–Emperor seamount chain began to form around 80 Mya, when the Pacific plate boundary system was very different. There is evidence that the chain started on a spreading ridge (the Pacific-Kula Ridge) that has now been subducted into the Aleutian trench. As the plate stretched due to shifting intraplate stress, the locus of melt extraction may have migrated off the ridge and into the plate interior, leaving a trail of volcanism behind it over millions of years. Supporters of this hypothesis argue that the wavespeed anomalies seen in seismic tomographic studies cannot be reliably interpreted as hot upwellings from the lower mantle.

=== Moving hotspot theory ===
The most heavily challenged element of Wilson's theory is whether hotspots are indeed fixed relative to the overlying tectonic plates. Indeed, such a large change in direction was never recorded by magnetic declinations, fracture zone orientations, or plate reconstructions; nor could a continental collision have occurred fast enough to produce such a pronounced bend in the chain.

Drill samples, collected by scientists as far back as 1963, suggested that the hotspot may have drifted over time, at the relatively rapid pace of about 4 centimeters (1.6 in) per year during the late Cretaceous and early Paleogene eras (81–47 Mya); in comparison, the Mid-Atlantic Ridge spreads at a rate of 2.5 cm (1.0 in) per year. In 1987, a study published by Peter Molnar and Joann Stock found that the hotspot does move relative to the Pacific Ocean; however, they interpreted this as the result of the relative motions of the North American and Pacific plates rather than that of the hotspot itself.

In 2003 new evidence suggested a mobile Hawaiian hotspot as the cause of the bend, not a change in plate motion. The Ocean Drilling Program, an international research effort to study the world's seafloors, funded a two-month expedition aboard research vessel JOIDES Resolution to drill lava samples from four of the oldest submerged Emperor seamounts, in the far northwest end of the chain: Detroit, Nintoku, and Kokos. Lead scientist John Tarduno told National Geographic:

The Hawaii bend was used as a classic example of how a large plate can change motion quickly. You can find a diagram of the Hawaii–Emperor bend entered into just about every introductory geological textbook out there. It really is something that catches your eye."

To test whether the bend was a result of a change in direction of the Pacific Plate, scientists analyzed the lava samples' geochemistry to determine where and when they formed. Age was determined by the radiometric dating of radioactive isotopes of potassium and argon. Researchers estimated that the volcanoes formed during a period 81 million to 45 million years ago. Tarduno and his team determined where the volcanoes formed by analyzing the rock for the magnetic mineral magnetite. While hot lava from a volcanic eruption cools, tiny grains within the magnetite align with the Earth's magnetic field, and lock in place once the rock solidifies. Researchers were able to verify the latitudes at which the volcanoes formed by measuring the grains' orientation within the magnetite. Paleomagnetists concluded that the Hawaiian hotspot had drifted southward sometime in its history, and that, 47 million years ago, the hotspot's southward motion greatly slowed, perhaps even stopping entirely. Combined with the Pacific Plate's constant westward motion, this would explain the track on the plate's surface, from the northernmost seamount to the southeast, then straight east after the plume stopped moving south.

In 2021 researchers proposed a three-stage Hawaii hotspot model. The first stage has ridge plume interaction in which the Hawaii hotspot either fed the Izanagi-Pacific or Kula-Pacific ridge. This period involved the creation of young oceanic crust and the formation of the Meji and Detroit seamounts. The second stage involved the mutual movements of the Pacific plate and the Hawaii hotspot. It is possible, as supported by gravitational modelling, that during this period the Hawaii hotspot drifted about 4-9 degrees to the south, in contrast to the northward Pacific Plate movement. The third stage has continued movement of the Pacific plate, with stagnation of the Hawaii hotspot.

== History of study ==
=== Ancient Hawaiians ===
The possibility that the Hawaiian Islands became older as one moved to the northwest was suspected by ancient Hawaiians long before Europeans arrived. During their voyages, seafaring Hawaiians noticed differences in erosion, soil formation, and vegetation, allowing them to deduce that the islands to the northwest (Niʻihau and Kauaʻi) were older than those to the southeast (Maui and Hawaiʻi). The idea was handed down the generations through the legend of Pele, the Hawaiian goddess of volcanoes.

Pele was born to the female spirit Haumea, or Hina, who, like all Hawaiian gods and goddesses, descended from the supreme beings, Papa, or Earth Mother, and Wakea, or Sky Father. According to the myth, Pele originally lived on Kauai, when her older sister Nāmaka, the Goddess of the Sea, attacked her for seducing her husband. Pele fled southeast to the island of Oahu. When forced by Nāmaka to flee again, Pele moved southeast to Maui and finally to Hawaiʻi, where she still lives in Halemaʻumaʻu at the summit of Kīlauea. There she was safe, because the slopes of the volcano are so high that even Nāmaka's mighty waves could not reach her. Pele's mythical flight, which alludes to an eternal struggle between volcanic islands and ocean waves, is consistent with geologic evidence about the ages of the islands decreasing to the southeast.

=== Modern studies ===
The Loa and Kea volcanic trends follow meandering parallel paths.

Three of the earliest recorded observers of the volcanoes were the Scottish scientists Archibald Menzies in 1794, James Macrae in 1825, and David Douglas in 1834. Just reaching the summits proved daunting: Menzies took three attempts to ascend Mauna Loa, and Douglas died on the slopes of Mauna Kea. The United States Exploring Expedition spent several months studying the islands in 1840–1841. American geologist James Dwight Dana was on that expedition, as was Lieutenant Charles Wilkes, who spent most of the time leading a team of hundreds that hauled a Kater's pendulum to the summit of Mauna Loa to measure gravity. Dana stayed with missionary Titus Coan, who would provide decades of first-hand observations. Dana published a short paper in 1852.

Dana remained interested in the origin of the Hawaiian Islands, and directed a more in-depth study in 1880 and 1881. He confirmed that the islands' age increased with their distance from the southeasternmost island by observing differences in their degree of erosion. He also suggested that many other island chains in the Pacific showed a similar general increase in age from southeast to northwest. Dana concluded that the Hawaiian chain consisted of two volcanic strands, located along distinct but parallel curving pathways. He coined the terms "Loa" and "Kea" for the two prominent trends. The Kea trend includes the volcanoes of Kīlauea, Mauna Kea, Kohala, Haleakalā, and West Maui. The Loa trend includes Lōiʻhi, Mauna Loa, Hualālai, Kahoʻolawe, Lānaʻi, and West Molokaʻi. Dana proposed that the alignment of the Hawaiian Islands reflected localized volcanic activity along a major fissure zone. Dana's "great fissure" theory served as the working hypothesis for subsequent studies until the mid-20th century.

Dana's work was followed up by the 1884 expedition of geologist C. E. Dutton, who refined and expanded Dana's ideas. Most notably, Dutton established that the island of Hawaii actually harbored five volcanoes, whereas Dana counted three. This is because Dana had originally regarded Kīlauea as a flank vent of Mauna Loa, and Kohala as part of Mauna Kea. Dutton also refined others of Dana's observations, and is credited with the naming of 'a'ā and pāhoehoe-type lavas, although Dana had also noted a distinction. Stimulated by Dutton's expedition, Dana returned in 1887, and published many accounts of his expedition in the American Journal of Science. In 1890 he published the most detailed manuscript of its day, which remained the definitive guide to Hawaiian volcanism for decades. In 1909 two major books about Hawaii's volcanoes were published ("The volcanoes of Kilauea and Mauna Loa" by W.T. Brigham and "Hawaii and its volcanoes" by C.H. Hitchcock).

In 1912 geologist Thomas Jaggar founded the Hawaiian Volcano Observatory. The facility was taken over in 1919 by the National Oceanic and Atmospheric Administration and in 1924 by the United States Geological Survey (USGS), which marked the start of continuous volcano observation on Hawaii Island. The next century was a period of thorough investigation, marked by contributions from many top scientists. The first complete evolutionary model was first formulated in 1946, by USGS geologist and hydrologist Harold T. Stearns. Since that time, advances (e.g. improved rock dating methods and submarine volcanic stages) have enabled the study of previously limited areas of observation.

In the 1970s, the Hawaiian seafloor was mapped using ship-based sonar. Computed SYNBAPS (Synthetic Bathymetric Profiling System) data filled gaps between the ship-based sonar bathymetric measurements. From 1994 to 1998 the Japan Agency for Marine-Earth Science and Technology (JAMSTEC) mapped Hawaii in detail and studied its ocean floor, making it one of the world's best-studied marine features. The JAMSTEC project, a collaboration with USGS and other agencies, employed crewed submersibles, remotely operated underwater vehicles, dredge samples, and core samples. The Simrad EM300 multibeam side-scanning sonar system collected bathymetry and backscatter data.

== Characteristics ==
=== Position ===
The Hawaiʻi hotspot has been imaged through seismic tomography, and is estimated to be 500–600 km (310–370 mi) wide. Tomographic images show a thin low-velocity zone extending to a depth of 1,500 km (930 mi), connecting with a large low-velocity zone extending from a depth of 2,000 km (1,200 mi) to the core-mantle boundary. These low seismic velocity zones often indicate hotter and more buoyant mantle material, consistent with a plume originating in the lower mantle and a pond of plume material in the upper mantle. The low-velocity zone associated with the source of the plume is north of Hawaiʻi, showing that the plume is tilted to a certain degree, deflected toward the south by mantle flow. Uranium decay-series disequilibria data has shown that the actively flowing region of the melt zone is 220 ± 40 km (137 ± 25 mi) km wide at its base and 280 ± 40 km (174 ± 25 mi) at the upper mantle upwelling, consistent with tomographic measurements.

=== Temperature ===
Indirect studies found that the magma chamber is located about 90–100 kilometers (56–62 mi) underground, which matches the estimated depth of the Cretaceous Period rock in the oceanic lithosphere; this may indicate that the lithosphere acts as a lid on melting by arresting the magma's ascent. The magma's original temperature was found in two ways, by testing garnet's melting point in lava and by adjusting the lava for olivine deterioration. Both USGS tests seem to confirm the temperature at about 1,500 °C (2,730 °F); in comparison, the estimated temperature for mid-ocean ridge basalt is about 1,325 °C (2,417 °F).

The surface heat flow anomaly around the Hawaiian Swell is only of the order of 10 mW/m^{2}, far less than the continental United States range of 25–150 mW/m^{2}. This is unexpected for the classic model of a hot, buoyant plume in the mantle. However, it has been shown that other plumes display highly variable surface heat fluxes and that this variability may be due to variable hydrothermal fluid flow in the Earth's crust above the hotspots. This fluid flow advectively removes heat from the crust, and the measured conductive heat flow is therefore lower than the true total surface heat flux. The low heat across the Hawaiian Swell indicates that it is not supported by a buoyant crust or upper lithosphere, but is rather propped up by the upwelling hot (and therefore less-dense) mantle plume that causes the surface to rise through a mechanism known as "dynamic topography".

=== Movement ===
Hawaiian volcanoes drift northwest from the hotspot at a rate of about 5–10 centimeters (2.0–3.9 in) a year. The hotspot has migrated south by about 800 kilometers (497 mi) relative to the Emperor chain. Paleomagnetic studies support this conclusion based on changes in Earth's magnetic field, as captured in the orientation of magnetically susceptible mineral grains imprinted on igneous rocks during crystallization of the different rock bodies, showing that these seamounts formed at higher latitudes than present-day Hawaii. Prior to the bend, the hotspot migrated an estimated 7 centimeters (2.8 in) per year; the rate of movement changed at the time of the bend to about 9 centimeters (3.5 in) per year. The Ocean Drilling Program provided most of the current knowledge about the drift. The 2001 expedition drilled six seamounts and tested the samples to determine their original latitude, and thus the characteristics and speed of the hotspot's drift pattern in total.

Each successive volcano spends less time actively attached to the plume. The large difference between the youngest and oldest lavas between Emperor and Hawaiian volcanoes indicates that the hotspot's velocity is increasing. For example, Kohala, the oldest volcano on Hawaiʻi island, is one million years old and last erupted 120,000 years ago, a period of just under 900,000 years; whereas one of the oldest, Detroit Seamount, experienced 18 million or more years of volcanic activity.

The oldest volcano in the chain, Meiji Seamount, perched on the edge of the Aleutian Trench, formed 85 million years ago. At its current velocity, the seamount will be destroyed within a few million years, as the Pacific Plate slides under the Eurasian Plate. It is unknown whether the seamount chain has been subducting under the Eurasian Plate, and whether the hotspot is older than Meiji Seamount, as any older seamounts have since been destroyed by the plate margin. It is also possible that a collision near the Aleutian Trench had changed the velocity of the Pacific Plate, explaining the hotspot chain's bend; the relationship between these features is still being investigated.

=== Magma ===
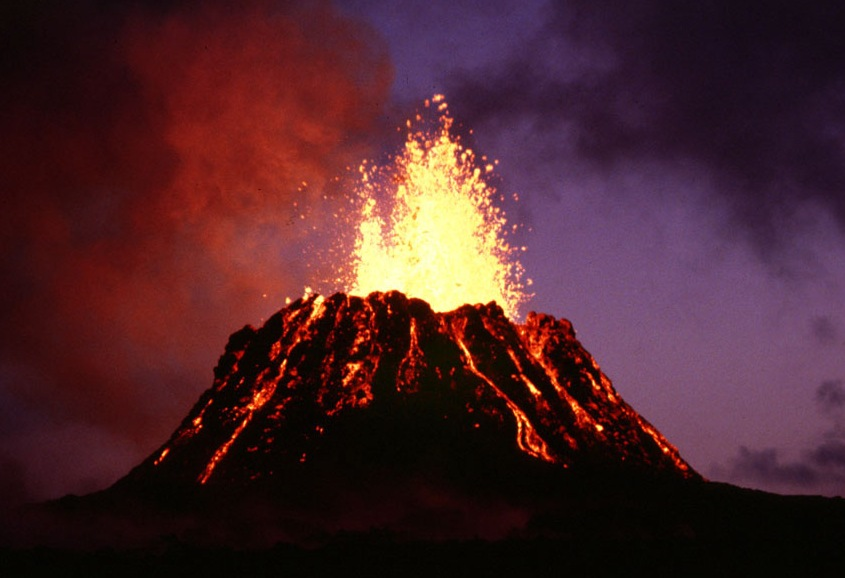
A lava fountain at Pu'u 'O'o, a volcanic cone on the flank of Kilauea. Kilauea is one of the most active volcanoes in the world and erupted nearly continuously from 3 January 1983 to April 2018.

The composition of the volcanoes' magma has changed significantly according to analysis of the strontium–neodymium–lead isotope ratios. The Emperor Seamounts were active for at least 46 million years, with the oldest lava dated to the Cretaceous Period, followed by another 39 million years of activity along the Hawaiian segment of the chain, totaling 85 million years. Data demonstrate vertical variability in the amount of strontium present in both the alkalic (early stages) and tholeiitic (later stages) lavas. The systematic increase slows drastically at the time of the bend.

Almost all magma created by the hotspot is igneous basalt; the volcanoes are constructed almost entirely of this or the similar in composition but coarser-grained gabbro and diabase. Other igneous rocks such as nephelinite are present in small quantities; these occur often on the older volcanoes, most prominently Detroit Seamount. Most eruptions are runny because basaltic magma is less viscous than magmas characteristic of more explosive eruptions such as the andesitic magmas that produce spectacular and dangerous eruptions around Pacific Basin margins. Volcanoes fall into several eruptive categories. Hawaiian volcanoes are called "Hawaiian-type". Hawaiian lava spills out of craters and forms long streams of glowing molten rock, flowing down the slope, covering acres of land and replacing ocean with new land.

=== Eruptive frequency and scale ===
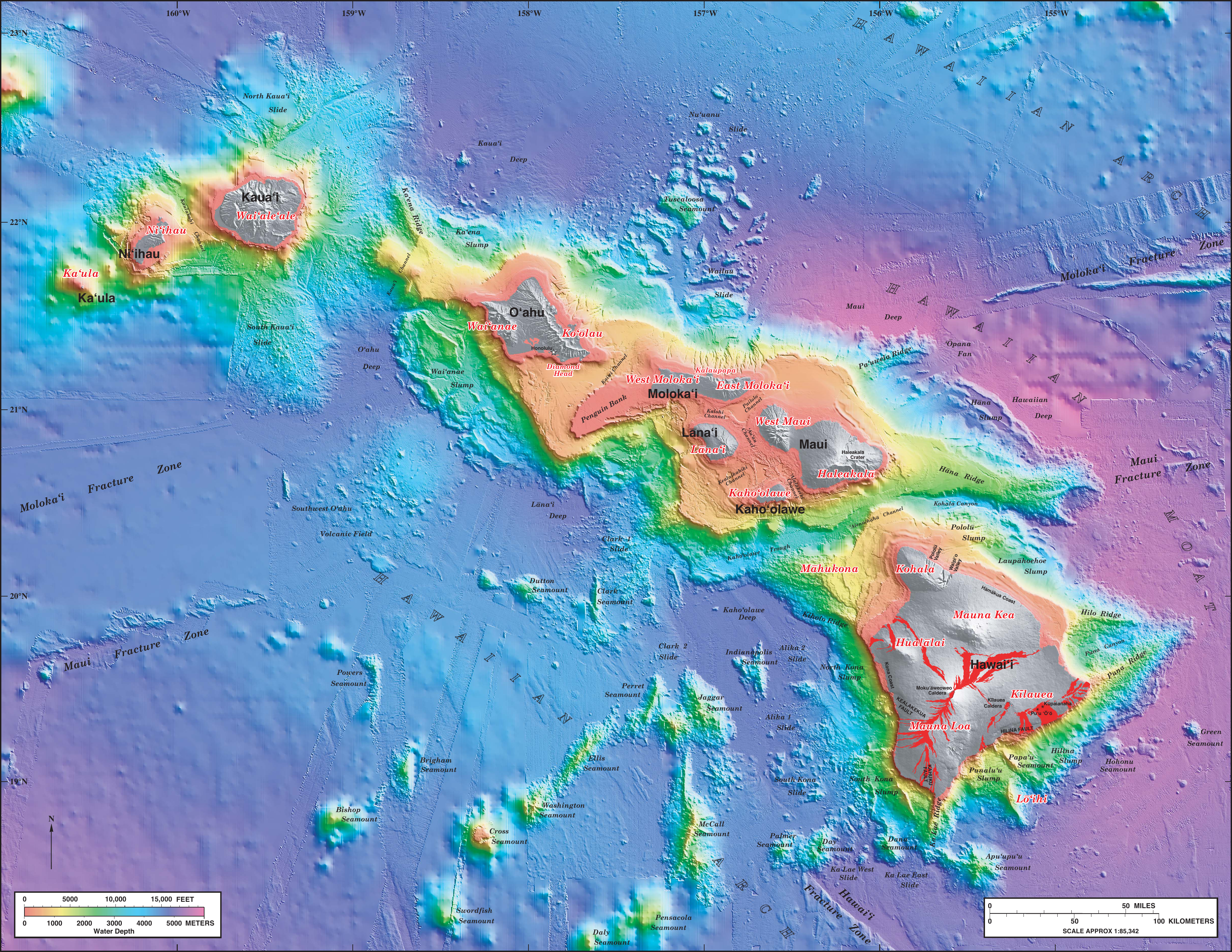
Bathymetry and topography of the southeastern Hawaiian Islands, with historic lava flows shown in red

There is significant evidence that lava flow rates have been increasing. Over the last six million years they have been far higher than ever before, at over 0.095 km^{3} (0.023 cu mi) per year. The average for the last million years is even higher, at about 0.21 km^{3} (0.050 cu mi). In comparison, the average production rate at a mid-ocean ridge is about 0.02 km^{3} (0.0048 cu mi) for every 1,000 kilometers (621 mi) of ridge. The rate along the Emperor seamount chain averaged about 0.01 cubic kilometers (0.0024 cu mi) per year. The rate was very low during the creation of the oldest still-visible seamounts of the hotspot 80 million years ago. The average lava production rate along the Hawaiian chain has been greater, at 0.017 km^{3} (0.0041 cu mi) per year. In total, the hotspot has produced an estimated 750,000 cubic kilometers (180,000 cu mi) of lava, enough to cover California with a layer about 1.5 kilometers (1 mi) thick.

The distance between individual volcanoes has shrunk. Although volcanoes have been drifting north faster and spending less time active, the far greater modern eruptive volume of the hotspot has generated more closely spaced volcanoes, and many of them overlap, forming such superstructures as Hawaiʻi island and the ancient Maui Nui. Meanwhile, many of the volcanoes in the Emperor seamounts are separated by 100 kilometers (62 mi) or even as much as 200 kilometers (124 mi).

=== Topography and geoid ===
A detailed topographic analysis of the Hawaiian–Emperor seamount chain reveals the hotspot as the center of a topographic high, and that elevation falls with distance from the hotspot. The most rapid decrease in elevation and the highest ratio between the topography and geoid height are over the southeastern part of the chain, falling with distance from the hotspot, particularly at the intersection of the Molokai and Murray fracture zones. The most likely explanation is that the region between the two zones is more susceptible to reheating than most of the chain. Another possible explanation is that the hotspot strength swells and subsides over time.

In 1953, Robert S. Dietz and his colleagues first identified the swell behavior. It was suggested that the cause was mantle up-welling. Later work pointed to tectonic uplift, caused by reheating within the lower lithosphere. However, normal seismic activity beneath the swell, as well as lack of detected heat flow, caused scientists to suggest dynamic topography as the cause, in which the motion of the hot and buoyant mantle plume supports the high surface topography around the islands. Understanding the Hawaiian swell has important implications for hotspot study, island formation, and inner Earth.

A 2024 study shows low velocity seismic zones beneath the Island of Hawaii at depths of 80-150 kilometers. This further supports the idea that the Hawaiian swell is supported by a hot up-welling of magma that is concentrated at the boundary of the lithosphere and the asthenosphere.

=== Seismicity ===
The Hawaii hotspot is a highly active seismic zone with thousands of earthquakes occurring on and near Hawaiʻi island every year. Most are too small to be felt by people but some are large enough to result in minor to moderate devastation. The most destructive recorded earthquake was the 2 April 1868 earthquake which had a magnitude of 7.9 on the Richter scale. It triggered a landslide on Mauna Loa, 5 mi (8.0 km) north of Pahala, killing 31 people. A tsunami claimed 46 more lives. The villages of Punaluʻu, Nīnole, Kaʻaʻawa, Honuʻapo, and Keauhou Landing were severely damaged. The tsunami reportedly rolled over the tops of the coconut trees up to 60 ft (18 m) high and it reached inland a distance of a quarter of a mile (400 m) in some places. The lower magnitude earthquakes are believed to occur through local stresses caused by spreading through the seepage of lava into fractures in the overlying rocks (wedging the rocks apart further) or the buoyancy of the underlying mantle plume upheaving the surrounding rocks. These local stresses would only produce lower energy earthquakes because of the lower tensile strength of basalt comparatively to its higher compressive strength. The higher magnitude earthquakes are derived from the basal (decollement) layer being influenced by deformities caused by the increased weight of the Hawaiian islands. These deformities could cause more compressive stresses, allowing for higher magnitude earthquakes. Such modelling to explain observed earthquake patterns suggests the concept that a soft center hole exists under the island of Hawaiʻi where the lithospheric Pacific plate is broken.

== Volcanoes ==
Over its 85 million year history, the Hawaii hotspot has created at least 129 volcanoes, more than 123 of which are extinct volcanoes, seamounts, and atolls, four of which are active volcanoes, and two of which are dormant volcanoes. They can be organized into three general categories: the Hawaiian archipelago, which comprises most of the U.S. state of Hawaii and is the location of all modern volcanic activity; the Northwestern Hawaiian Islands, which consist of coral atolls, extinct islands, and atoll islands; and the Emperor Seamounts, all of which have since eroded and subsided to the sea and become seamounts and guyots (flat-topped seamounts).

=== Volcanic characteristics ===
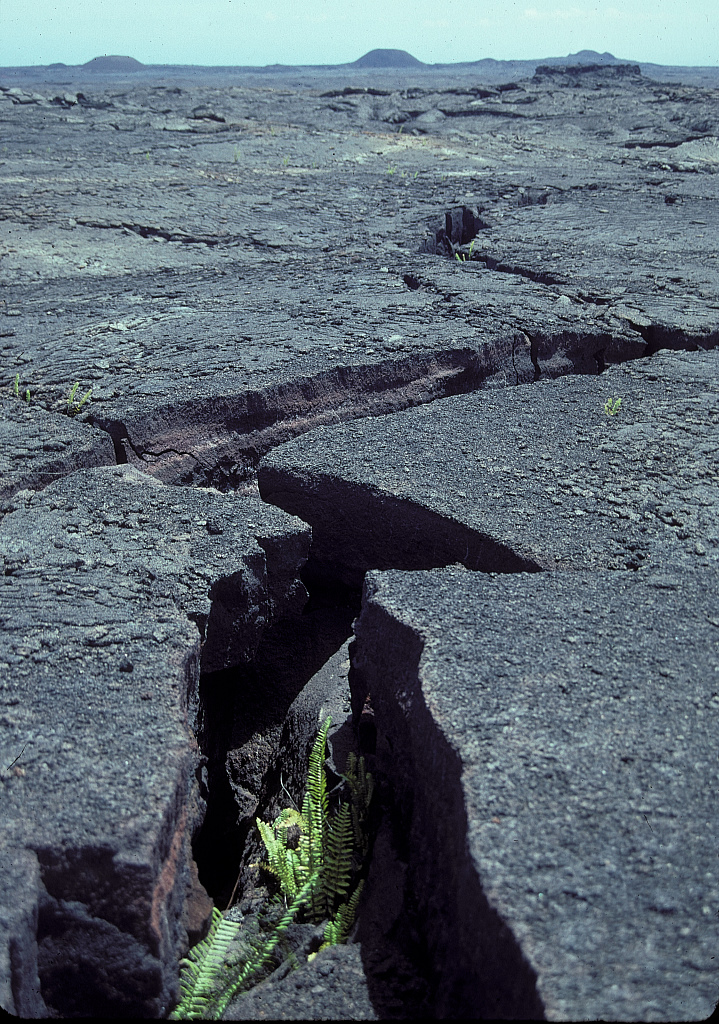
Kīlauea's eastern rift zone

Hawaiian volcanoes are characterized by frequent rift eruptions, their large size (thousands of cubic kilometers in volume), and their rough, decentralized shape. Rift zones are a prominent feature on these volcanoes, and account for their seemingly random volcanic structure. The tallest mountain in the Hawaii chain, Mauna Kea, rises 4,205 meters (13,796 ft) above mean sea level. Measured from its base on the seafloor, it is the world's tallest mountain, at 10,203 meters (33,474 ft); Mount Everest rises 8,848 meters (29,029 ft) above sea level. Hawaii is surrounded by a myriad of seamounts; however, they were found to be unconnected to the hotspot and its volcanism. Kīlauea erupted continuously from 1983 to 2018 through Puʻu ʻŌʻō, a minor volcanic cone, which has become an attraction for volcanologists and tourists alike.

=== Landslides ===
The Hawaiian islands are carpeted by a large number of landslides sourced from volcanic collapse. Bathymetric mapping has revealed at least 70 large landslides on the island flanks over 20 km (12 mi) in length, and the longest are 200 km (120 mi) long and over 5,000 km^{3} (1,200 mi^{3}) in volume. These debris flows can be sorted into two broad categories: slumps, mass movement over slopes which slowly flatten their originators, and more catastrophic debris avalanches, associated with flank and sector collapse, which fragment volcanic slopes and scatter volcanic debris past their slopes. These slides have caused massive tsunamis and earthquakes, fractured volcanic massifs, and scattered debris hundreds of miles away from their source. Active slumping is currently taking place on the south flank of the Big Island, where the Hilina Slump comprises a mobile portion of the island's mass south of Kīlauea.

Slumps tend to be deeply rooted in their originators, moving rock up to 10 km (6 mi) deep inside the volcano. Forced forward by the mass of newly ejected volcanic material, slumps may creep forward slowly, or surge forward in spasms that have caused the largest of Hawaii's historical earthquakes, in 1868 and 1975. Debris avalanches, meanwhile, are thinner and longer, and are defined by volcanic amphitheaters at their head and hummocky terrain at their base. Rapidly moving avalanches carried 10 km (6 mi) blocks tens of kilometers away, disturbing the local water column and causing a tsunami. Evidence of these events exists in the form of marine deposits high on the slopes of many Hawaiian volcanoes, and has marred the slopes of several Emperor seamounts, such as Daikakuji Guyot and Detroit Seamount.

GPS measurements on the eastern flank of Hawaii Island over a 5-year epoch show the pattern of collapse with velocities of up to 15 cm/year (5.9 in/year) relative to the Pacific Plate.

=== Evolution and construction ===
An animated sequence showing the erosion and subsidence of a volcano, and the formation of a coral reef around it—eventually resulting in an atoll

Hawaiian volcanoes follow a well-established life cycle of growth and erosion. After a new volcano forms, its lava output gradually increases. Height and activity both peak when the volcano is around 500,000 years old and then rapidly decline. Eventually it goes dormant, and eventually extinct. Weathering and erosion gradually reduce the height of the volcano until it again becomes a seamount.

This life cycle consists of several stages. The first stage is the submarine preshield stage, currently represented solely by Kama'ehuakanaloa. During this stage, the volcano builds height through increasingly frequent eruptions. The sea's pressure prevents explosive eruptions. The cold water quickly solidifies the lava, producing the pillow lava that is typical of underwater volcanic activity.

As the seamount slowly grows, it goes through the shield stages. It forms many mature features, such as a caldera, while submerged. The summit eventually breaches the surface, and the lava and ocean water "battle" for control as the volcano enters the explosive subphase. This stage of development is exemplified by explosive steam vents. This stage produces mostly volcanic ash, a result of the waves dampening the lava. This conflict between lava and sea influences Hawaiian mythology.

The volcano enters the subaerial subphase once it is tall enough to escape the water. Now the volcano puts on 95% of its above-water height over roughly 500,000 years. Thereafter eruptions become much less explosive. The lava released in this stage often includes both pāhoehoe and ʻaʻā, and the currently active Hawaiian volcanoes, Mauna Loa and Kīlauea, are in this phase. Hawaiian lava is often runny, blocky, slow, and relatively easy to predict; the USGS tracks where it is most likely to run, and maintains a tourist site for viewing the lava.

Mechanical collapse, indicated by large submarine landslides adjacent to landslide scars on the islands, is an ongoing process that shapes the early phases of volcano construction for each of the islands.

After the subaerial phase the volcano enters a series of postshield stages involving mechanical collapse creating subsidence and erosion, becoming an atoll and eventually a seamount. Once the Pacific Plate moves it out of the 20 °C (68 °F) tropics, the reef mostly dies away, and the extinct volcano becomes one of an estimated 10,000 barren seamounts worldwide. Every Emperor seamount is a dead volcano.

=== Coral reef development on Hawaiian Hotspot islands ===
Reef growth and morphology often show the progression from underwater volcano to subaerial shield to seamount. The process of reef building around the margins of a volcanic island once it is formed, relates to both local island subsidence and global sea level increase. Other local factors such as water temperature and topography are important in reef formation. These fringing reefs gradually accrete vertically and seaward as an inactive volcano subsides, coinciding with a rise in relative sea level. A modern example, Kailua Bay off Oahu Hawaii, has been studied extensively to understand reef carbonate generation, sediment production and deposition. It is estimated that gross carbonate production is approximately 1.22 kg m^{−2} y^{−1} while sediment production via bio erosion is 0.33 kg m^{−2} y^{−1} resulting in an average vertical accretion of 0.066 cm/year (0.026 in/year). This rate is considerably lower than worldwide averages for fringing reef accretion 0.1–0.4 cm/year (0.039–0.157 in/year). Researchers are investigating the connections between strong wave action, reef biodiversity, rising sea levels and anthropogenic influence. As island subsidence progresses, fringing reefs develop into barrier reefs and once the volcano becomes a seamount, barrier reefs form atolls. Midway Atoll is a good example of the final stage of the evolution of a hotspot volcanic island.

== See also ==
- List of volcanic hotspots
- List of volcanoes in the Pacific Ocean
- List of volcanoes in the United States
- Maui Nui
- Types of volcanic eruptions
