= Albert Thomas Price =

British Geophysicist

Albert Thomas Price (30 January 1903 – 13 December 1978) was a British geophysicist.

He was born in Nantwich, Cheshire, and educated at Monmouth School, where he was head boy, and at Manchester University, where he graduated B.Sc. (Mathematics) in 1924.

In 1925 he was appointed Assistant Lecturer in Mathematics at Queen's University, Belfast, moving in 1926 to Imperial College, London, where he was promoted to Assistant Professor in 1946. He remained at Imperial until 1951, when he was appointed Professor of Mathematics at the Royal Technical College, Glasgow. In 1952 he became Visiting Investigator at the Department of Terrestrial Magnetism at Carnegie Institution for Science in Washington and at the Institute of Geophysics, University of California. He was finally Professor of Applied Mathematics at the University of Exeter from 1952 to 1968 and Professor Emeritus thereafter.

In the 1930s his work was primarily on the subject of geomagnetism, developing mathematical models which proved the validity of global electromagnetic induction. During the Second World War Price acted as a scientific consultant to the Admiralty and various government departments, working on such problems as underwater explosions and rocket-assisted parachute deceleration. Towards the end of the war he collaborated on the work on floating breakwaters which were used in the Normandy landing. After the war he resumed his work on geomagnetism, developing the theory of induction in thin sheets.

In 1969 he was awarded the Gold Medal of the Royal Astronomical Society for his work on geomagnetism, especially for his study of the electrical conductivity of the Earth's core.

The Price Medal, awarded annually by the Royal Astronomical Society for outstanding work in geophysics, is named in his honour.

He was married to Ann. He died in 1978 at the age of 75.
