= John Tarduno =

John Tarduno is an American physicist and astronomer. He is a Distinguished Scientist at the Laboratory for Laser Energetics at the University of Rochester. He won a Price Medal from the Royal Astronomical Society in 2016 for "opening the way to new insights into mantle convection" and a Petrus Peregrinus Medal from the European Geosciences Union in the following year for his "seminal studies on the evolution of the early Earth’s magnetic field".

Tarduno is a Guggenheim Fellow, a fellow of the American Geophysics Union, the American Association for the Advancement of Science and the Geological Society of America. He was featured in a BBC documentary about the magnetic field of Earth.
