= Gerhard Fanselau =

German geophysicist

Gerhard Fanselau (30 April 1904, Leipzig – 28 April 1982, Potsdam) was a German geophysicist.

== Biography ==
Fanselau's parents were the steward Wladislaus Fanselau and Sophie. As the family moved often for his father's work, Gerhard attended the humanist schools in Leipzig, Breslau, Halle and Berlin. From 1923 to 1927, he studied mathematics and physics at the University of Berlin.

In 1927 Fanselau started work at the Meteorological Institute of the University of Berlin and the following year moved to the Magnetic Observatory, led by Adolf Schmidt. The first few years he was engaged in the construction of the observatory in Niemegk. The electrification of the Berlin Stadtbahn disturbed geomagnetic observations in Potsdam and Seddin. In 1929 he developed the Fanselau coil, a modified version of the Helmholtz coil, which uses a special arrangement of coils to improve the homogeneity of the generated magnetic field. In 1933 he became head of the observatory at Niemegk. In 1935 he qualified as a professor of geophysics in Berlin, and in 1941 he commenced a teaching position there. In 1940 he joined the Nazi Party.

Early in 1946, the Niemegk observatory resumed operations. In 1950 Fanselau was also director of the Geomagnetic Institute in Potsdam. In 1954 he was appointed professor at the Humboldt University in Berlin, and in 1958 at the Karl Marx University in Leipzig.

== Publications ==
- Geomagnetism and Aeronomy, 1965
- with Horst Wiese: Geomagnetic instruments and measurement methods, 1960
- with Peter Mauersberger: The theory of electromagnetic fields, 1964
- High Fläming Nature Park, 1974
- with Peter Mauersberger: About the product derived from the geomagnetic field, 1959
- with Julius Bartels : Geophysical lunar tables 1850-1975, 1938
- To evaluate the potential calculations in limited areas, 1960
- Geophysical Colloquium of 1 December 1956 in Freiberg, 1957
- Some contributions to the theory of fluid mechanics and their application in the radiometer theory, 1927
- Results of geomagnetic observations Prof. Filchner on his second trip to Tibet 1935-1937, 1943
- The production of homogeneous magnetic fields by currents rectangle, 1956
