= Kailua (disambiguation) =

Kailua may refer to:

== Places in Hawaii ==
- Kailua, Honolulu County, Hawaii, a census-designated place on Hawaii's island of Oahu
  - Kailua High School, in Honolulu county
- Kailua-Kona, Hawaii, a census-designated place on Hawaii's island of Hawaii
  - Kailua-Kona Airport, in Hawaii county

== Other uses ==
- USS Kailua (IX-71), formerly CS Dickenson, a civilian cable-laying ship that became an auxiliary ship of the United States Navy in the Second World War

== See also ==
- Kahlua (disambiguation)
