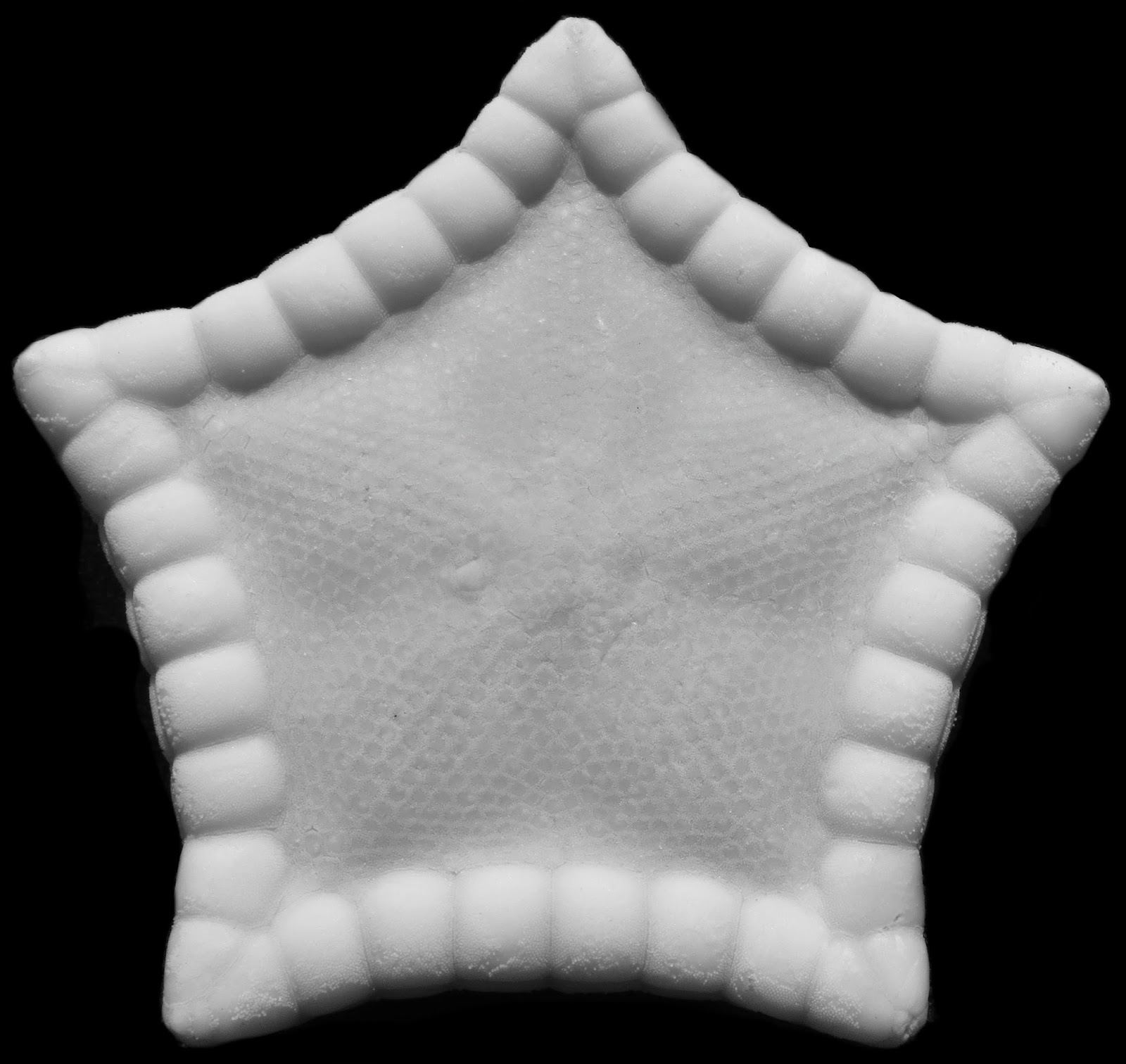

Scientific classification
- Kingdom: Animalia
- Phylum: Echinodermata
- Class: Asteroidea
- Order: Valvatida
- Family: Goniasteridae
- Genus: Apollonaster
- Species: A. kelleyi

Binomial name
- Apollonaster kelleyi Mah, 2015

= Apollonaster kelleyi =

Species of starfish

Apollonaster kelleyi is a species of abyssal sea star within the family Goniasteridae, that was discovered in 2015 in the Hawaiian region. It is identified as part of the Apollonaster genus based on its bare abactinal plate surfaces and multiple accessory granule rows on its abactinal plates. The species name kelleyi was chosen in honor of Dr. Christopher Kelley, director of the Hawaii Undersea Research Laboratory.
