= Pisces IV =

Three person deep submergence vehicle

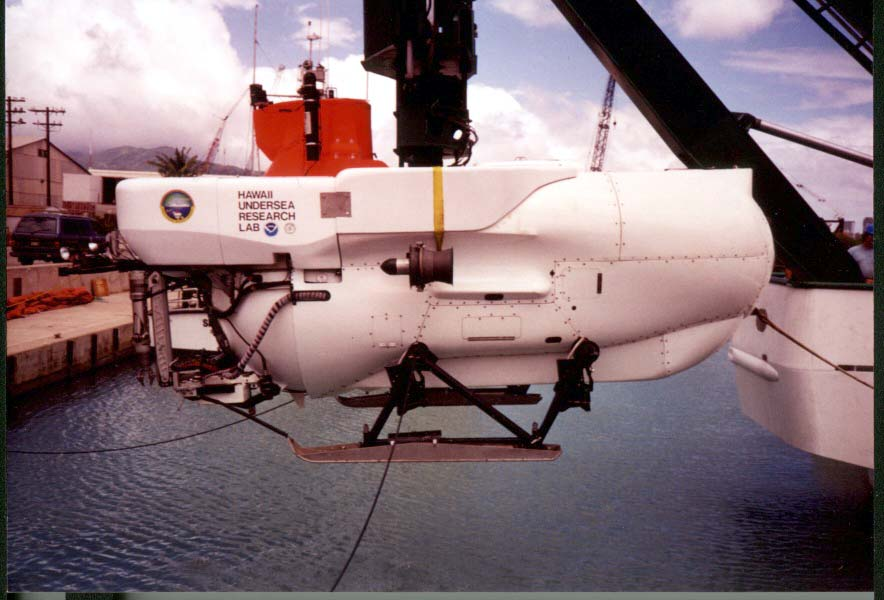
- Pisces IV being launched from its support vessel, the R/V Ka‘imikai-o-Kanaloah

History

Canada
- Name: Pisces IV
- Owner: Department of Fisheries and Oceans
- Operator: Institute of Ocean Sciences
- Builder: Hyco International Hydrodynamics, North Vancouver
- Completed: 1973
- Fate: Transferred to the NOAA due to budget cuts (last cruise: 1983)

United States
- Name: Pisces IV
- Owner: Hawaii Undersea Research Laboratory
- Operator: Hawaii Undersea Research Laboratory
- Homeport: Honolulu, Hawaii

General characteristics
- Displacement: 13,000 kg (29,000 lb)
- Length: 6.10 m (20 ft 0 in)
- Beam: 3.20 m (10 ft 6 in)
- Height: 3.35 m (11 ft 0 in)
- Propulsion: 2 side mounted reversible thrusters tiltable through 90 degree, Two lead-acid battery systems-120 VDC at 330 Ah capacity and 12 - 24 VDC at 220 Ah capacity
- Speed: 2 kn (3.7 km/h; 2.3 mph)
- Range: 7-10 hours operational time
- Endurance: 140 hours
- Test depth: 2,000 m (6,600 ft)
- Crew: 3 men
- Sensors & processing systems: High definition and low light cameras, digital video recorder, twin manipulators, sample basket, CTD profiler, scanning sonar, pinger, submersible tracking package, external lights, external temperature probes, suction sampler, laser scaling package, hydraulic saw, core samplers, sediment scoops
- Notes: 600 lb (270 kg) load capacity

Pisces IV is a three-person, battery-powered deep-submergence vehicle (or DSV), with a maximum operating depth of 2,000 m (6,600 ft). The craft was built by Hyco International Hydrodynamics in Vancouver, and is currently owned by the Hawaii Undersea Research Laboratory arm of the National Oceanic and Atmospheric Administration. It and its sister, Pisces V, are Pisces class submersibles used by the NOAA for oceanic exploration.

Pisces IV was constructed in 1973 and immediately placed in the service of the Department of Fisheries and Oceans of Canada. The DSV was used by the Institute of Ocean Sciences and operated at different times in the Atlantic, Arctic, and Pacific oceans. After over 1886 dives, budget cuts forced the cancellation of support for the project. Pisces IV has since been replaced in that role by ROPOS.

More recently, after transfer to the US, Pisces IV was certified for use by the American Bureau of Shipping in 2000, and underwent modernization and upgrading in 2001 in preparation for the diving season. During training cruises in 2002, Pisces IV and its sister Pisces V found a Japanese midget submarine outside Pearl Harbor that had been detected on the morning of the attack on the harbor in 1941. Associate director of the Hawaii Undersea Research Laboratory, John Wiltshire, said the discovery was "probably the most significant archaeological find in the Pacific". At the time of its discovery, on 28 August 2002, the search for the sub had been ongoing for 61 years. Analysis of the wreck shows that it was brought down by a shell from the USS Ward that breached the sub's conning tower, confirming that the United States fired the first shot in its war with Japan.

Today, Pisces IV and its sister Pisces V spend most of their time diving near Hawaiʻi. Both are contained on the R/V Ka‘imikai-o-Kanaloa. The subs are serviced between dives on the ship's deck, and are ready for launch on the next day, and one is generally kept on deck in ready status for the majority of any cruise.

The majority of information gathered by the sub comes from its two cameras, one of which is generally on at all times. Pisces VI is equipped with a single "bright light" camera and low-power black and white camera, both of which can be controlled by scientists on board as seen fit. The low-power camera is used to record the activities of organisms that otherwise respond poorly to bright light. Another, higher-definition camera is also available.

Samples are collected by a pair of manipulator arms; skilled pilots can use the sub's two arms, the right one more versatile than the left, to collect samples and store them in a mounted basket for later evaluation. The manipulator arms are also used to place temperature probes in hydrothermal vents, and occasionally for movement instead of thrusters, in order to avoid disturbing sediment.
