= USS Kailua =

Cable repair ship

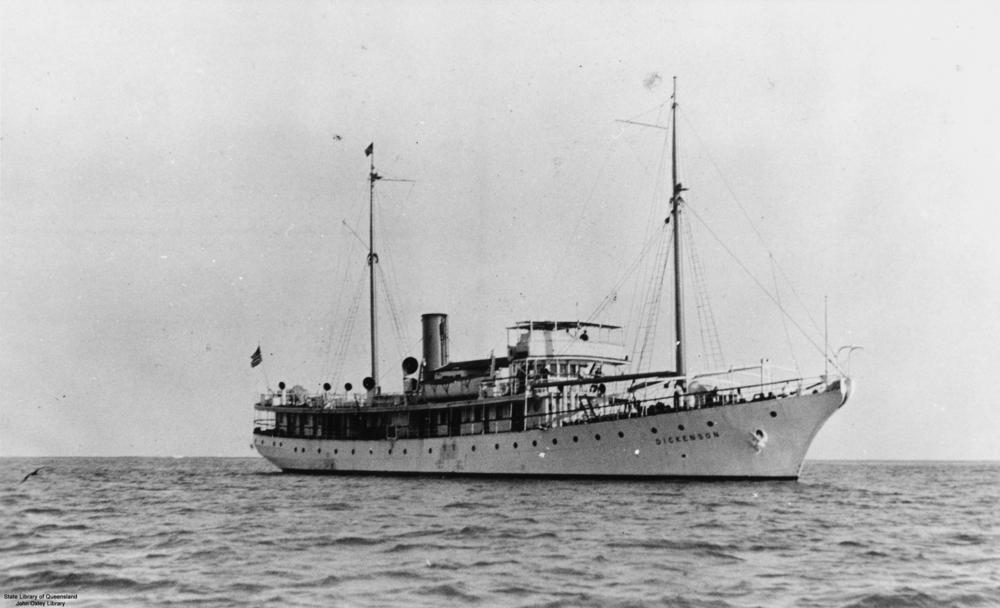
- Civilian cable layer Dickenson, later USS Kailua

History

United States
- Name: CS Dickenson (1923–42); USS Kailua (1942–45)
- Namesake: Samuel S. Dickenson; Kailua, Hawaii
- Owner: Commercial Pacific Cable Company
- Operator: Commercial Pacific Cable Company (1923–42); United States Navy (1942–45)
- Port of registry: New York
- Builder: Sun Shipbuilding & Drydock Company
- Yard number: 57
- Laid down: 16 November 1922
- Launched: 17 February 1923
- Completed: (Delivered) 4 May 1923
- Acquired: (by Navy) 19 May 1942
- Commissioned: 5 May 1943
- Decommissioned: 29 October 1945
- Maiden voyage: 23 May 1923 Chester, PA — Honolulu, Hawaii
- Identification: US official number 222822; code letters MFBS (until 1933); Call sign KFHG (from 1934)
- Fate: Sunk as target February 7, 1946

General characteristics
- Tonnage: 831 GRT; tonnage under deck 742; 391 NRT
- Displacement: 1,411 tons
- Length: 174.3 ft (53.1 m) p/p; 189 ft 9 in (57.84 m) o/a
- Beam: 30.1 ft (9.2 m)
- Draft: 15 ft 2 in (4.62 m)
- Depth: 21.8 ft (6.6 m)
- Installed power: 166 NHP
- Propulsion: triple expansion engine, single screw
- Speed: 9.8 kn (18.1 km/h)
- Complement: 61
- Armament: 1 × 3 in (76 mm) gun; 4 × .50-caliber machine guns; 2 × depth charge tracks

USS Kailua (IX-71) was originally CS Dickenson, a civilian supply and personnel transport cable-repair ship of the Commercial Pacific Cable Company that was based in Honolulu serving the island cable stations at Midway and Fanning Island.

The cable repair ship served as support ship for the company's central Pacific cable stations as well as doing cable repair. Dickenson evacuated personnel from the islands and arrived with the evacuees of Honolulu as the attack on Pearl Harbor began.

The ship was acquired by the United States Navy on 19 May 1942 to be renamed Kailua and assigned the Miscellaneous Unclassified (IX) number 71. After wartime service in the Pacific and Southwest Pacific Area the ship was sunk as a target on 7 February 1946. The wreck was found 20 mi (17 nmi; 32 km) off the coast of Oahu at a depth of 2,000 ft (609.6 m) in 2013 by the Hawaii Undersea Research Laboratory.

== CS Dickenson ==
Dickenson was designed by naval architects Cox & Stevens for the Commercial Pacific Cable Company to be built by the Sun Shipbuilding & Drydock Company of Chester, Pennsylvania. The ship was to be stationed at Honolulu for both supply and personnel support for the stations in the central Pacific and cable repair.

The ship's keel was laid as hull number fifty-seven on 16 November 1922, launched 17 February 1923 and delivered to the owner on 4 May. The ship was named for Samuel S. Dickenson who had planned, scouted and negotiated cable landing arrangements with local authorities, including in China and Japan, for the first trans Pacific cable begun in 1902 with cable from San Francisco to Honolulu. Dickenson's daughter, Mary Dickenson, sponsored the ship at launch. Dickenson was registered in New York. The ship sailed 23 May 1923 under Captain George Piltz, in charge of the Honolulu-Midway supply service for Commercial Pacific Cable Company, from Chester to Honolulu. On 12 July 1923 Dickenson sailed for Midway arriving on 27 July and sailing for the return to Honolulu on 27 July.

Superstructure on the shelter deck consisted of a forward deck house with bridge and pilot house at boat deck level and quarters for navigating officers and the superintendent's (Note: In charge of overall operations, particularly during cable work.) stateroom and office. The after house contained six two bed staterooms, two lavatories and one bath room. Below the shelter deck, on the upper deck aft, were quarters for engineering officers, steward and galley personnel with crew quarters forward in two person staterooms. Galley and hospital spaces were also located on that deck. All living areas were ventilated and equipped with steam heat. In the hold, forward of boiler room and service oil bunkers, were four refrigerated spaces totaling 2,000 cubic feet (56.6 m^{3}). The fuel oil bunkers consisted of the service bunkers taking three frame spaces between the boiler room and refrigeration plant and two reserve bunkers each side aft at the engine room.

Ship's power was by means of four corrugated furnaces with a grate area of 82 square feet (8 m^{2}) that heated two single-ended boilers, 12 ft (3.7 m) in diameter and 11 ft (3.4 m) in length, with a combined heating surface of 3,303 square feet (307 m^{2}). They supplied steam at 185 lb_{f}/in^{2} to her three-cylinder triple expansion engine, which developed 800 horsepower [166 NHP] and gave her a speed of 9.8 kn (18.1 km/h). The two masts could carry sail to steady the ship under normal operating conditions.

The ship had a 20 ft (6.1 m) diameter, 8 ft (2.4 m) high cable storage tank and two 18 in (0.5 m) bow sheaves with a modified cargo winch for cable operations. For the dual role of cable work and supply ship for the Commercial Pacific Cable Company's remote island stations there were two cargo holds and room for twelve passengers. Registry information for 1939 shows a crew of 28 for normal commercial cable and passenger/cargo operations.

In 1941 Cable & Wireless chartered the ship to evacuate cable station and plantation staff from Fanning Island. Dickenson arrived off Honolulu with British evacuees from the island as the attack on Pearl Harbor began. The ship was followed by a Japanese submarine which was sunk by a U.S. destroyer.

== Naval service ==
The Navy bareboat chartered Dickenson on 19 May 1942 and renamed her Kailua. She was commissioned on 5 May 1943.

Kailua left Pearl Harbor on 15 May 1943 to join the Service Force of the United States Seventh Fleet. Upon her arrival at Pago Pago, Samoa, 25 May she immediately began operations as an auxiliary in the Pacific islands. In June she reached Milne Bay, New Guinea, and for the next year remained there laying cables, anti-submarine nets, and buoys. Kailua reached Pearl Harbor 4 July 1944 and performed similar services there for the rest of the War.

She was decommissioned at Pearl Harbor 29 October 1945 and sunk as a target on 7 February 1946.

== Rediscovery ==
In 2013 the wreck of the Kailua was discovered by the Hawaii Undersea Research Laboratory. It is located 20 mi (17 nmi; 32 km) off the coast of Oahu at a depth of 2,000 ft (609.6 m). The discovery was made on a dive of Pisces V to examine potential maritime heritage targets off Oahu. After checking two Japanese Type A midget submarines that were known, two other, unknown, targets were examined. The first was recognized as the cable repair ship and the second unknown was eventually shown to be the Japanese I-400-class submarine I-400 sunk during 1946 torpedo testing.

== Awards ==
- Asiatic-Pacific Campaign Medal
- World War II Victory Medal
