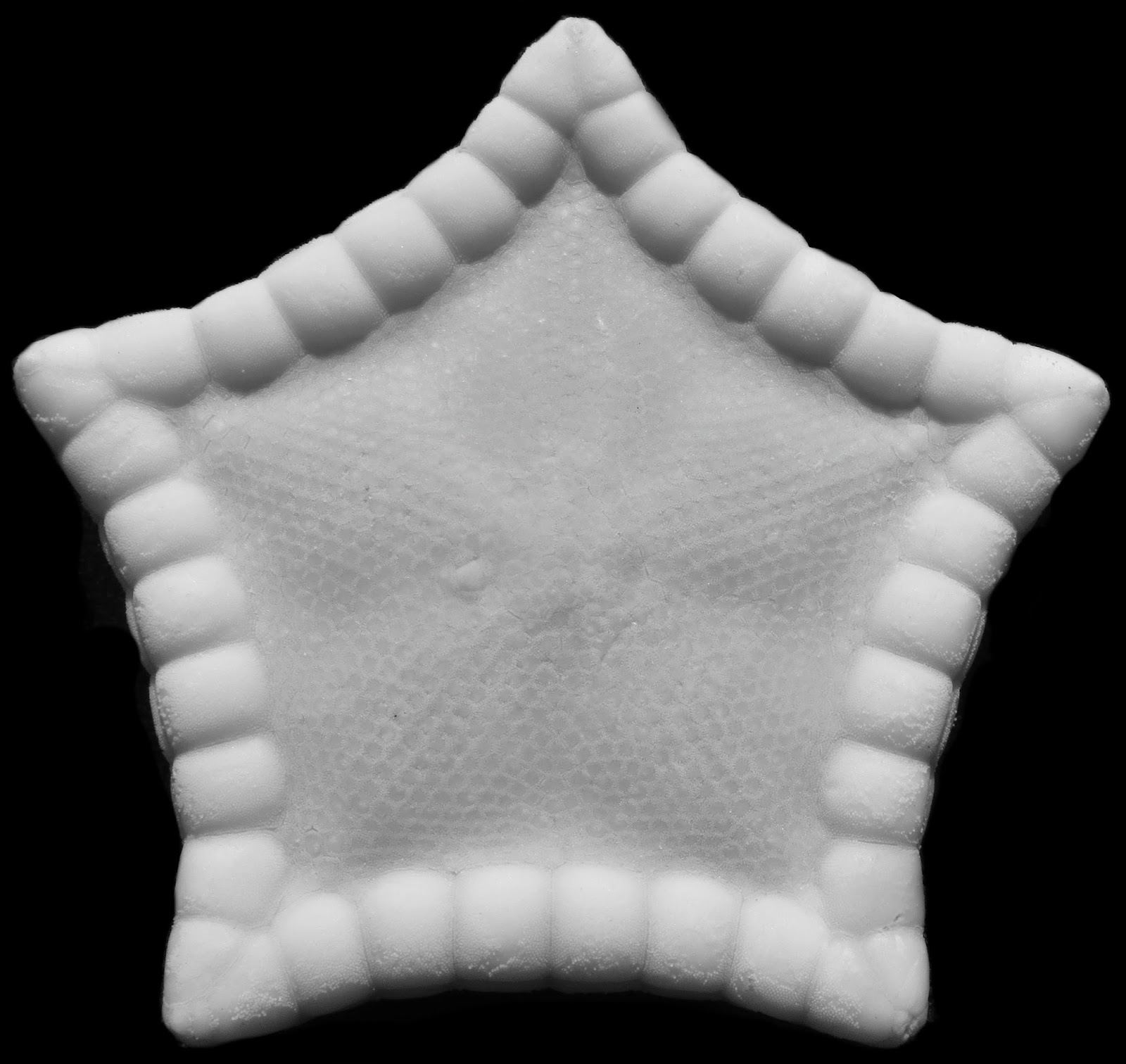
- Apollonaster kelleyi

Scientific classification
- Kingdom: Animalia
- Phylum: Echinodermata
- Class: Asteroidea
- Order: Valvatida
- Family: Goniasteridae
- Genus: Apollonaster; Halpern, 1970

Species
- See text

= Apollonaster =

Genus of starfishes

Apollonaster is a genus of abyssal sea stars in the family Goniasteridae. They can be identified by their bare abactinal plate surfaces and multiple accessory granule rows on their abactinal plates. To date, Apollonaster has been found in the tropical Atlantic region (A. yucatanensis) and Hawaiian Islands region (A. kelleyi) oceans, with no other locations or species being known as of 2015.

== Species list ==
According to World Register of Marine Species:

- Apollonaster kelleyi Mah, 2015 -- Hawaii
- Apollonaster yucatanensis Halpern, 1970 -- Caribbean

This species was named in 1970 as a tribute to the Apollo mission.
