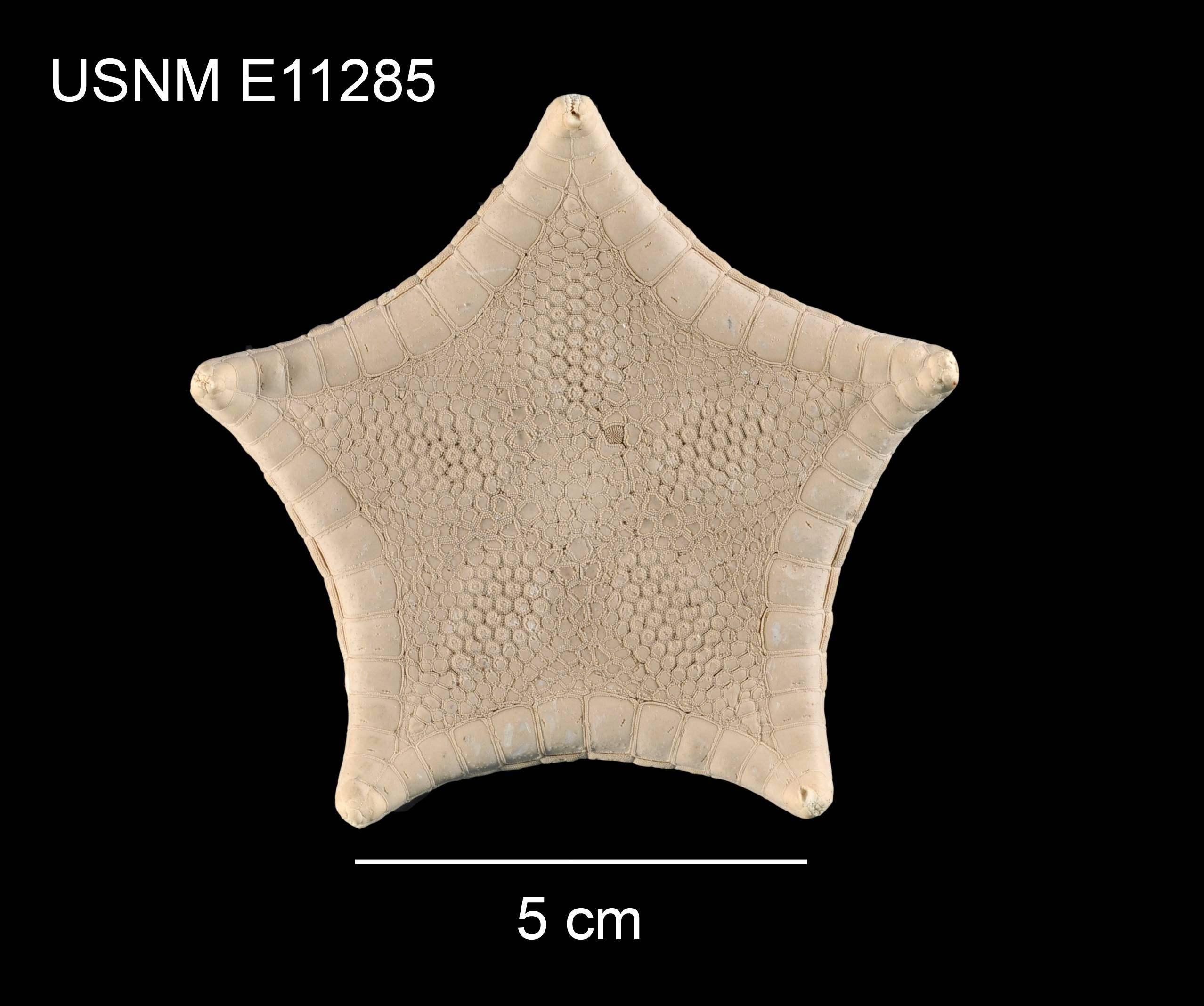

Scientific classification
- Domain: Eukaryota
- Kingdom: Animalia
- Phylum: Echinodermata
- Class: Asteroidea
- Order: Valvatida
- Family: Goniasteridae
- Genus: Apollonaster
- Species: A. yucatanensis

Binomial name
- Apollonaster yucatanensis Halpern, 1970

= Apollonaster yucatanensis =

Species of sea star

Apollonaster yucatanensis is a species of abyssal sea star within the family Goniasteridae. Its distribution is within the Gulf of Mexico and Caribbean Sea, at depths of 1135.5 meters below sea level in benthic environments.
