= Kahlua (disambiguation) =

Kahlua may refer to:

- Kahlúa, a Mexican coffee-flavored liqueur
- Kahlua (software), an implementation of the programming language Lua for Java ME

== See also ==
- Kailua (disambiguation)
