= ROPOS =

ROV used mainly for scientific research

ROPOS ("Remotely Operated Platform for Ocean Science") is an remotely operated underwater vehicle used primarily for scientific research. It was originally built in Vancouver by International Submarine Engineering and purchased by the Canadian federal government. The same government program also operated the Pisces IV crewed submersible, now in Hawaii being run by the Hawai'i Undersea Research Laboratory (HURL) who found the long-lost two-man Japanese sub which heralded the attack on Pearl Harbor.

The funding for the Canadian submersible program eventually dried up, but by that time the user group had been established and long term experiments put in place on the sea floor. The Canadian Scientific Submersible Facility (CSSF) was formed and leased ROPOS from the government for several years before finally purchasing the ROV a few years ago. In 2005 the vehicle was extensively rebuilt and now boasts a 4,000-pound (1,800 kg) thru-frame lift capability (see below).

The ROV is controlled and powered from a surface vessel. Electrical power is supplied through an umbilical, or tether, which also has an optical fibre for telemetry and data. Electrical power is used to power components such as lights and cameras, but most of the energy is used in an electric motor to drive a hydraulic pump. The hydraulic pump in turn powers the thrusters and hydraulic components of the ROV. This is referred to as an electro-hydraulic system.

ROPOS is unusual as it is routinely modified to work in three different ranges: 1000 m (540 fathoms); 4000m (2,187 fathoms); and (rarely) 5,000 m (2,700 fathoms). Each set up is progressively larger. ROPOS also has "plug and play" equipment; A hot fluid sampler (HFS) at about 200 pounds (90 kg) and requires 120 V AC and a data line to function, and a number of different hydraulic functions which are available for scientific equipment, similar to the Woods Hole vehicles Jason and Jason 2.

== Thru-frame lift ==
ROPOS is capable of lifting 4,000 pounds (1,800 kg) off the sea floor: the load is attached to the ROV and is lifted by the mid-depth system LARS (launch and recovery system), an enhanced crane modified to accommodate the ROV.
