= Hawaii Undersea Research Laboratory =

American educational undersea research program

Hawaiʻi Undersea Research Laboratory (HURL)
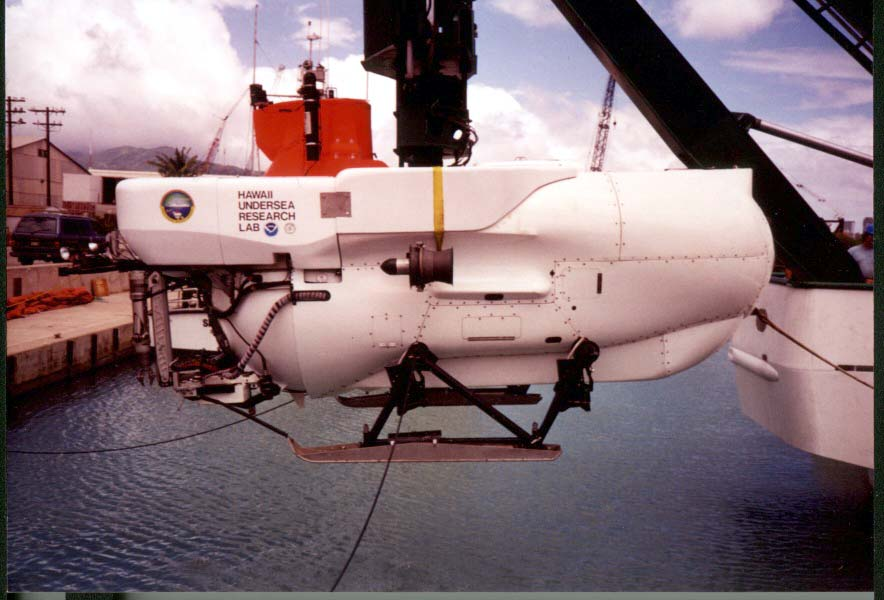
- Established: 1980; 46 years ago
- Research type: Marine sciences, Pacific maritime heritage, marine engineering
- Location: Honolulu, Hawaiʻi, United States
- Campus: University of Hawaiʻi at Mānoa
- Website: http://www.soest.hawaii.edu/HURL/

The Hawaiʻi Undersea Research Laboratory (HURL) is a regional undersea research program within the School of Ocean and Earth Science and Technology (SOEST) at University of Hawaiʻi at Mānoa, in Honolulu. It is considered one of the more important of the independently run undersea research laboratories in the U.S. HURL operated two deep diving submersibles, the Pisces IV and Pisces V and specializes in supporting scientific ocean research and exploration. HURL is actively involved in monitoring deep-sea ecosystems, including coral habitats and fisheries, and conducts maritime archaeology research including documenting World War II wreckage from the Attack on Pearl Harbor in 1941.

HURL suspended operations after the retirement of the support ship Kaʻimikai-o-Kanaloa, but may resume operations in the future.

== Science Dive Program ==
The Hawaiʻi Undersea Research Laboratory was founded in cooperation with U.S. government's National Oceanic and Atmospheric Administration (NOAA) in 1980. HURL became a regional center in NOAA's National Undersea Research Program (NURP). The University of Hawaiʻi had been donated the submersible Makaliʻi (formerly Star II), which launched HURL's science dive program on July 14, 1981, with its first dive into the Oak Crater in Eniwetok Atoll. This three-month long expedition included scientists from the Defense Nuclear Agency, Lawrence Livermore Labs, and the Air Force Weapons Agency to conduct research on the effects of nuclear testing. Since 1981, they spent nearly 9,000 hours underwater around the Pacific Ocean. HURL has facilitated the long-term study of the Lo’ihi submarine volcano since 1987 and has analyzed its unique ecosystem and documented the growth of this new Hawaiian Island including investigation the collapse event in 1996. In 2005, they conducted a five-month expedition from Honolulu, Hawaiʻi to New Zealand along the Tonga-Kermadec arc during which they conducted 78 submersible dives and explored 13 different active volcanoes, 12 of which had never been explored before. In 2011, HURL made the first two-sub dive into Lo’ihi's pit crater for a National Geographic documentary and celebrated 1,000 dives with the Pisces submersibles.

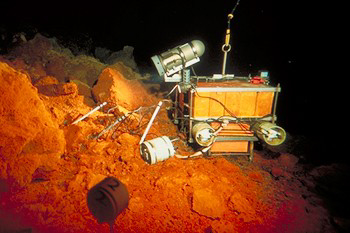
Volcanic vent observatory on Lo'ihi seamount set up by HURL.

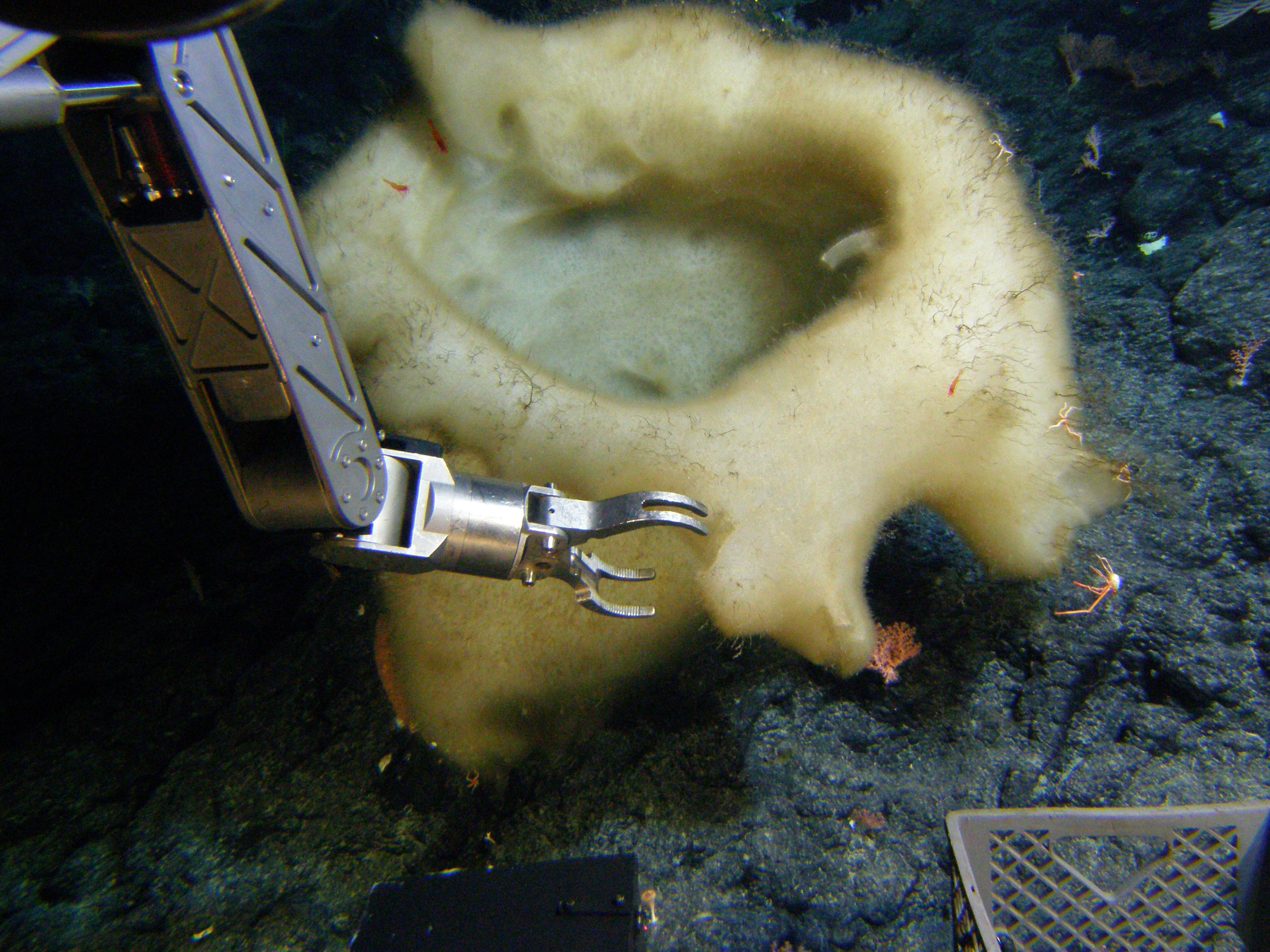
Manipulator arm on the Pisces V submersible collecting a glass sponge.

At the end of March in 2012, NOAA zeroed out all funding to HURL and closed down its National Undersea Research Center (NURC, formerly NURP). All program assets owned by NOAA were gifted to the University of Hawaiʻi. The lab continued to operate on residual funding and on what limited funding that the University of Hawaiʻi could provide. Anticipating this decline in funding, HURL resurrected some of their old technology by placing their Launch, Recovery, and Transport (LRT) back into service. The LRT-12 and the LRT-30a were submersible pontoon barges, that were used from 1981–1996 to launch the Makaliʻi and the Pisces V respectfully before the arrival of University of Hawaiʻi research ship, Kai’imikai-o-Kanaloa (KOK). By returning to operating of the LRT-30a, the lab was able to reduce their day rate by nearly 70%, thus making them more attractive to potential customers. HURL continued to operate through the 2013 and 2014 dive seasons logging another 46 dives. Maritime Heritage and documentary dives contributed more needed financing, but it was evident that the University of Hawaiʻi would be unable to financially carry the program for any duration without more outside support. By January 1, 2015, nearly all of HURL's staff had been let go leaving only a few personnel to maintain the two submersibles.

In June 2015, a proposed science expedition to China had emerged, allowing HURL to proceed with its required refit on the Pisces IV and the addition of more operations personnel. The project was scheduled for March to July 2016. However, after completing their series of test dives and within two days of their scheduled departure, the project was “put on hold” indefinitely due to “increased tensions in the South China Sea”. In the fall of 2016, new interest in the submersibles led to the first dives on Cook and McCall Seamounts and a return visit to the Lo’ihi Volcano funded by Conservation International. This successful exploration was immediately followed by two expeditions funded by the National Science Foundation (NSF) to the Northwest Hawaiian Islands and Emperor Seamounts in 2016 and 2017 consisting of 24 and 53 coral survey dives.

The submersibles' support ship R/V Kaʻimikai-o-Kanaloa was retired in 2019.

=== Maritime Heritage Discoveries and Ordnance Surveys ===
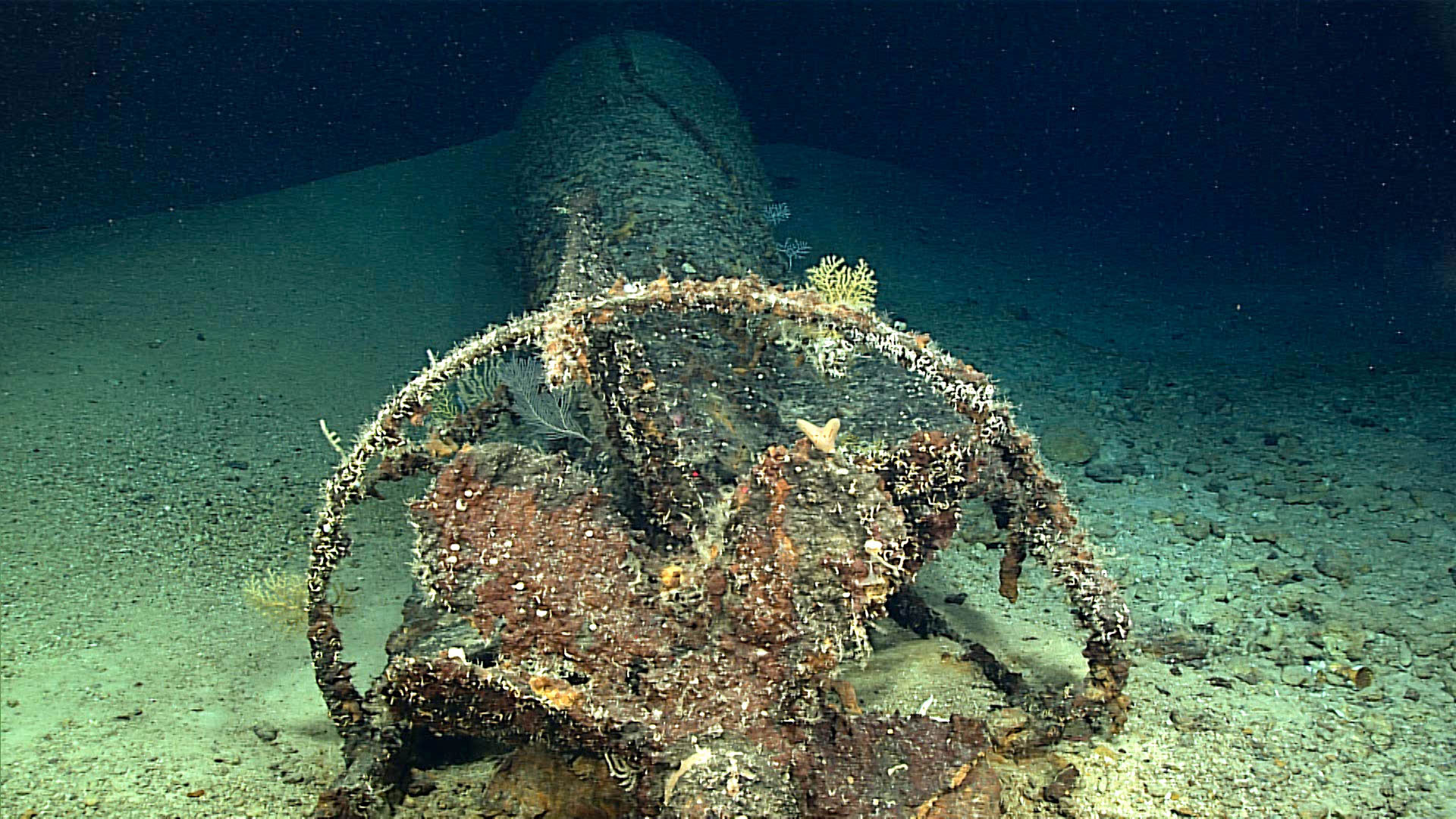
Underwater image of the Japanese mini sub involved in the attack on Pearl Harbor. It was first discovered by HURL sunk off the south shore of Oʻahu.

On December 6, 1984 the submersible Makaliʻi came upon a fully intact Douglas SBD-5 Dauntless dive bomber. This aircraft was found 213 m deep off Koko Head, Oʻahu during a science dive studying deep invertebrates. The aircraft was videoed, surveyed, and subsequently its history was researched. The discovery kick-started a side program within the lab to continue the documenting the wreck sites of the various aircraft, ships, submarines, automobiles, and other miscellaneous remnants of Hawaiʻi's past that the submersibles encountered. HURL has since surveyed and researched more than 140 such sites. Nearly all of these were found during each year's 3 preseason test and training dives. A number of these artifacts have been found to be of significant historic value, such as the Ward's midget submarine and the mysterious “3-Piece” midget submarine that took part in the December 7th attack on Pearl Harbor. The giant seaplane “Marshall Mars”, the gunboat USS Bennington, the cable-laying ship USS Kailua, the Japanese fleet submarines I-400, I-401, I-124, and I-201, and several turn-of-the-century Inter-island steamships have also been located and surveyed. Other artifacts discovered include over 25 WWII era landing craft ranging in size from 30’ LVT's to 330’ LST's, various aircraft as early as four 1931 Keystone PK-1 Seaplanes to WWII and Korean War era military planes to light engine civilian aircraft that went down in the 1980s and 90's. More than 60 automobiles have been found that were built from 1917 to the mid-1940s Including military trucks, construction equipment, hand cranked touring cars, and sedans. These vehicles are spread out over a 7-mile span off South Oʻahu.

On March 3, 2009 HURL began a series of dives off South Oʻahu under contract with the US Army to conduct an assessment of the chemical weapons disposed at sea after WWII. The Hawaiʻi Undersea Military Munitions Assessment (HUMMA) project led by Margo Edwards consisted of 16 dives in 2009 and 14 dives in 2012. Although HURL has observed thousands of pieces of ordnance of numerous types over the past decades, the primary weapon of interest for this project was the M41A2 100-pound mustard gas bombs of which it is estimated that 16,000 were disposed of off Oahu. More than 100 of this particular type of bomb have been observed and several were selected for survey. Samples were collected from the sediment, water, and marine life in the immediate vicinity of these bombs. Other conventional weapons, and areas void of ordnance, were also surveyed for comparison.

=== Salvage & Special Projects ===
In addition to its traditional science dive program, HURL has also conducted a number of dives to locate and recover lost vehicles or instruments. This started with the recovery of the SeaMarc II lost off South Oahu in January 1989. As of 2015, HURL had recovered eleven items from the deep sea with a 100% success rate. The submersibles have also been chartered by several non-academic organizations for various projects that range from pipeline inspections, sewer outfall surveys, cable route surveys, and numerous television documentaries. In 2011 and again in 2013, the Pisces V made dives in conjunction with technical divers. The submersible would pinpoint particular sites of interest and deploy a buoy with down line for the divers. This allowed the divers, who had a very limited bottom time, to make the most efficient use of their time on location and conduct operations that required more precise dexterity than the submersible manipulator arms can perform.

==== Salvage Operations Details ====
Item recovered	Date
SeaMarc II Deep Ocean Mapping System	November 18, 1984
Super Phantom Remotely Operated Vehicle (ROV)	January 27, 1989
US Geological Survey Array	August 11, 1997
Free Vehicle Time-Lapse Camera (YehCam)	August 14, 2006
Science Applications International Corporation (SAIC)	November 20, 2006
High Frequency Acoustic Recording Package (HARP)	November 28, 2007
Towed Optical Assessment Device (TOAD)	April 6, 2009
Sea Glider 513	October 5, 2010
HUMMA Time-lapse Camera Recovery	November 27, 2012
Acoustic Doppler Current Profiler (ADCP)	July 10, 2013
University of Hawaiʻi Respirometer Instrument Package	August 9, 2013

== Documentaries involving HURL ==
Title	Year	Featured on	Producer
Hidden Hawaii	1991	IMAX	Destination Cinema
Underwater Volcano Hunters	1999	Investigative Reports	A&E Television Network
Die Tiefsee (The Deep Sea)	2001	German Television ZDF	Christian Bock
Attack of the Japanese Midget Subs	2002	War Stories	Fox News
Japanese Sub at Pearl Harbor	2003	Deep Sea Detectives History Channel	History Channel
Secrets of Pearl Harbor	2004	Military History Channel, Discovery Channel	Evergreen Films
Oh! Friends and Fathers	2005	Asahi TV-Japan	Asahi Productions
Violent Hawaii	2005	Nature, PBS	Moana Productions
Jaws of the Pacific	2005	Shark Week Discovery Channel	Shark Entertainment Inc.
First Shot. The Secret Submarine Attack at Pearl Harbor	2005	Ingo Bauernfeind, Arizona Museum Aossication	Hawaii Pacific University Film School
Myths of Pearl Harbor	2006	Unsolved History Discovery Channel	Termite Art Productions
Drain the Ocean	2009	National Geographic Channel	National Geographic, Burning Gold Productions
Hunt for the Samurai Subs	2009	Expedition Week	National Geographic, Wildlife Productions
Mystery of Pearl Harbor. Closing in on the Fate of the Midget Submarines	2009	Japanese Television	NKH
Japanese Super Sub, Secrets of the Dead	2009	National Geographic Channel	Windfall Films/Spy Pond Productions
Killer Subs in Pearl Harbor	2010	NOVA, PBS	Lone Wolf Productions
Alien Deep in 3D (Episode 1)	2012	Alien Deep National Geographic Channel	National Geographic
Pacific Secrets	2014	Pearl Harbor	Discovery Studios Inc., Various Discovery Films
The Truth: The Japanese Navy Secret Submarine I-400 Project	2015	Japanese Television	NKH
Drain the Ocean WWII	2016	National Geographic Channel	National Geographic, Mallison Sadler Productions
