= Pisces V =

Deep-submergence vehicle

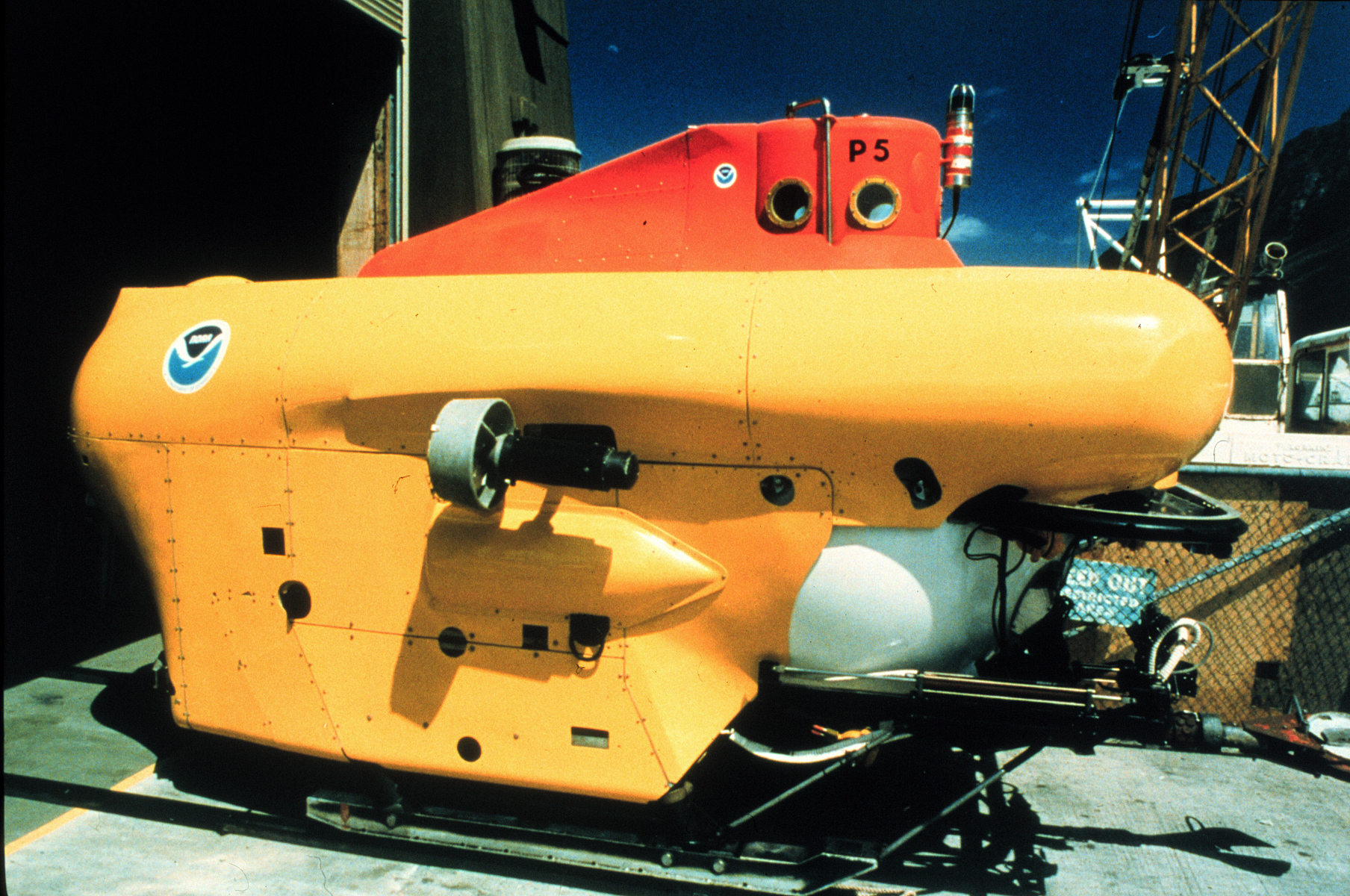

History

US
- Name: Pisces V

General characteristics
- Length: 20 feet (6.1 m)
- Width: 10 ft 6in
- Height: 11 ft
- Weight: 13 tons
- Crew: 1 Pilot 2 Observers
- Life support: 140 hours for 3 people
- Maximum operating depth: 6,280 ft (~2000m)
- Power: 2 lead-acid battery systems
- Propulsion: 2 side-mounted reversible thrusters tiltable through 90 degrees
- Speed: 3 Kts
- Dive duration: 7–9 hours
- Materials: Personnel sphere, Trim sphere, and Aft sphere: HY 100 steel
- Frame: Welded, oil-filled, pressure compensated tubular steel
- Viewports: 3 forward-looking acrylic windows, 6" interior-14" dia exterior

Pisces V is a type of crewed submersible ocean exploration device, powered by battery, and capable of operating to depths of 2,000 metres (6,600 ft), a depth that is optimum for use in the sea waters around the Hawaiian Islands. It is used by scientists to explore the deep sea around the underwater banks in the main Hawaiian Islands, as well as the underwater features and seamounts in the Northwestern Hawaiian Islands, specifically around Kamaʻehuakanaloa Seamount (formerly Loihi).

In 1973, Pisces V took part in the rescue of Roger Mallinson and Roger Chapman, who were trapped on the seabed in Pisces V's sister submersible Pisces III. In August 2002, Pisces V and her sister Pisces IV discovered a World War II Japanese midget submarine outside of Pearl Harbor which had been sunk by the destroyer USS Ward in the first American shots fired in World War II. In 2011, marine scientists from HURL celebrated the 1,000 dives of Pisces V and Pisces IV.

== Uses ==
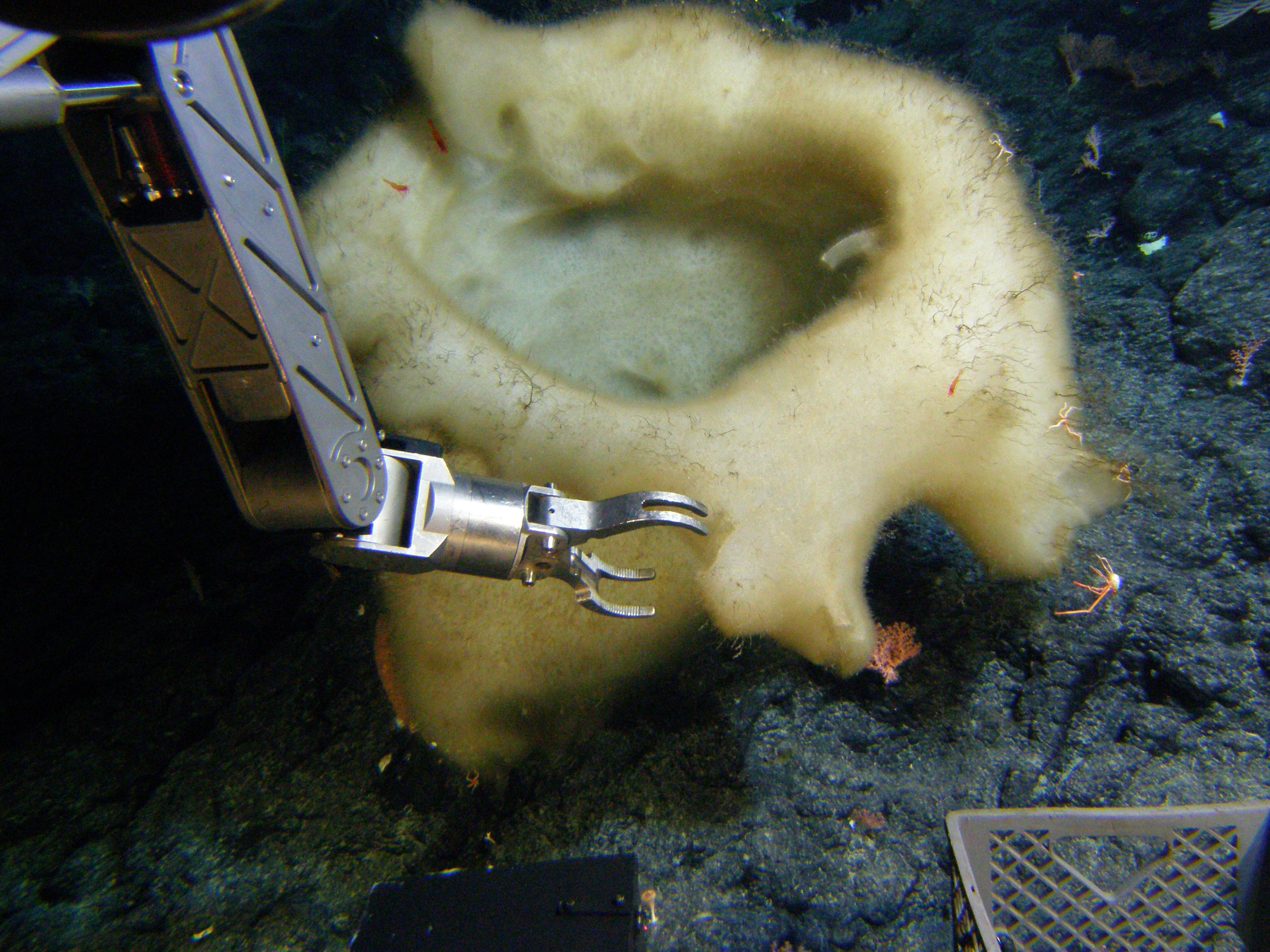
Pisces V's manipulator arm taking a sample of the "cauldron sponge".

The advantage of having two is that it allows preparation for an emergency. While one of the submersibles is conducting its dive, the other remains at readiness should there be an emergency, needing to be boarded on ship and hurried to the site of the problem. Such an emergency could include the submersible becoming tangled in fishing nets or entrapped in rocks or debris on the ocean floor. In such cases, the second heads to the rescue. There are also research experiments where it is advantageous to use the two vessels together.

In August 2002, Pisces V and her sister vessel Pisces IV discovered a Japanese midget submarine; sunk on December 7, 1941 by the destroyer USS Ward in the first American shots fired in World War II, the submarine was hit by a 4"/50 caliber gun shot and depth charged shortly before the attack on Pearl Harbor began. The submarine was found in 400 metres (1,300 ft) of water about 5 miles (8.0 km) off the mouth of Pearl Harbor. This was the culmination of a 61-year search for the vessel and has been called "the most significant modern marine archeological find ever in the Pacific, second only to the finding of Titanic in the Atlantic". In 2003, Pisces V visited the Japanese midget submarine it had found in Pearl Harbor the year before. The U.S. State Department worked in conjunction with the Japanese Foreign Ministry to determine Japanese wishes regarding the fate of the midget submarine. The submersibles are used by HURL as teaching devices. In 2008, two members of the Tampa Bay Chapter of SCUBAnauts were invited to team with HURL and to visit the historic wreck of the Japanese submarine. One SCUBAnaut said as he stepped on Pisces V that "it looked and felt as if I were in a space shuttle preparing for lift-off". A mock-up of the control panel of Pisces V can be visited by the public at the Mokupāpapa Discovery Center in Hilo, Hawaii.

On March 5, 2009, scientists discovered seven new species of bamboo coral, six of which may be of a new genus, an extraordinary finding in a genus so broad. They were able to find these specimens through the use of Pisces V which allowed them to reach depths beyond those attained by scuba divers. They also discovered a giant sponge approximately three feet tall and three feet wide that scientists named the "cauldron sponge".
