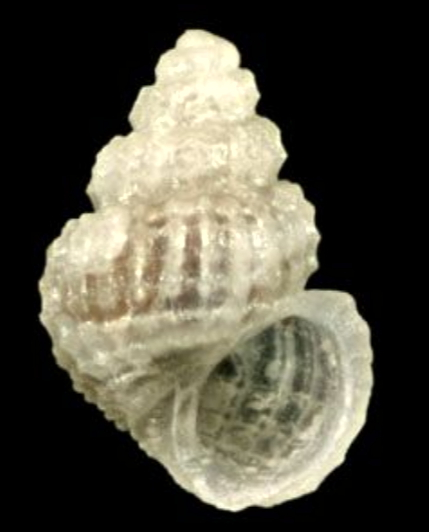
- Shell of Alvania micropilosa (specimen at the Natuurhistorisch Museum, Rotterdam)

Scientific classification
- Kingdom: Animalia
- Phylum: Mollusca
- Class: Gastropoda
- Subclass: Caenogastropoda
- Order: Littorinimorpha
- Superfamily: Rissooidea
- Family: Rissoidae
- Genus: Alvania
- Species: A. micropilosa

Binomial name
- Alvania micropilosa Gofas, 2007

= Alvania micropilosa =

Species of gastropod

Alvania micropilosa is a species of minute sea snail, a marine gastropod mollusc or micromollusc in the family Rissoidae.

== Description ==
The shell is 2.4–2.8 mm high and consists of a 1.5-whorl protoconch and a teleoconch of 3.0–3.75 whorls. The protoconch bears fine spiral threads, while the teleoconch is sculptured with widely spaced axial ribs intersected by spiral cords that form rounded nodules. The outer lip is thickened and smooth internally. The shell is white, sometimes with a faint pale-brown blotch behind the outer lip. Minute periostracal hairs are present but visible only under scanning electron microscopy.

The species differs from Alvania cimicoides by its paucispiral protoconch, nearly colorless shell, and distinctive periostracal hairs.

== Distribution ==
This species occurs in the Atlantic Ocean on the Seewarte Seamounts. It has been recorded from the Meteor, Hyères, and Irving seamounts at depths of 305–790 m, where it is common on Meteor Seamount but rare on the Hyères and Irving seamounts.
