= Executive Order 13792 =

- Executive Order on the Review of Designations Under the Antiquities Act
- Type: Executive order
- Number: 13792
- President: Donald Trump
- Signed: April 26, 2017

Federal Register details
- Federal Register document number: 2017-08908
- Publication date: May 1, 2017
- Document citation: 20429

Summary
- Directs the United States Secretary of the Interior to conduct a review of all Presidential designations or expansions of designations under the Antiquities Act made since January 1, 1996.

Repealed by
- Executive Order 13990, "Protecting Public Health and the Environment and Restoring Science to Tackle the Climate Crisis", January 20, 2021

Executive Order 13792, entitled "Review of Designations Under the Antiquities Act," is an executive order issued by US President Donald Trump on April 26, 2017, that directed the Secretary of the Interior to review designations of national monuments made since 1996. The order applies to all new monuments greater than 100,000 acres in size and monuments that were expanded by at least 100,000 acres. Twenty-two land monuments and five marine monuments that were created by the administrations of Bill Clinton, George W. Bush, and Barack Obama were subject to review.

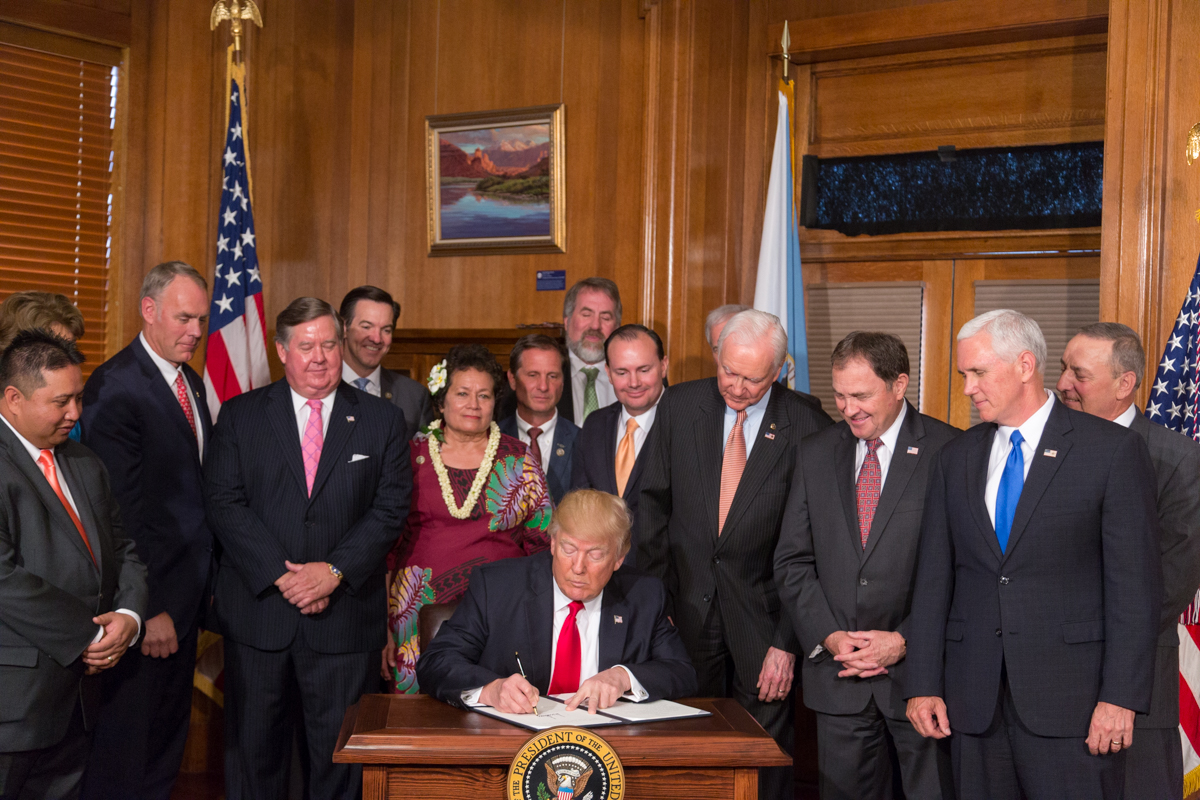
President Trump signing the Executive Order for the review.

The order required Secretary of the Interior Ryan Zinke to produce an interim report within 45 days that includes a recommendation on the future of Bears Ears National Monument. A final report was due within 120 days. In announcing the order, Trump called the designation of large national monuments "another egregious use of government power."

== Purpose and policy ==
Trump signed the executive order to allow national monument designations to be rescinded or reduce the size of sites as the administration pushes to open up more federal land to drilling, mining and other development.

The Executive Order put forward the following as policy in Section 1:

Designations of national monuments under the An Act for the Preservation of American Antiquities (Antiquities Act of 1906), recently recodified at sections 320301 to 320303 of Title 54 of the United States Code (the "Antiquities Act" or "Act"), have a substantial impact on the management of Federal lands and the use and enjoyment of neighboring lands. Such designations are a means of stewarding America's natural resources, protecting America's natural beauty, and preserving America's historic places. Monument designations that result from a lack of public outreach and proper coordination with State, tribal, and local officials and other relevant stakeholders may also create barriers to achieving energy independence, restrict public access to and use of Federal lands, burden State, tribal, and local governments, and otherwise curtail economic growth. Designations should be made in accordance with the requirements and original objectives of the Act and appropriately balance the protection of landmarks, structures, and objects against the appropriate use of Federal lands and the effects on surrounding lands and communities.

== Review of National Monument Designations ==
Trump has indicated that he was eager to change the boundaries of a 1.35-million-acre national monument Obama declared in December 2016, in Utah, Bears Ears National Monument.

The United States Secretary of the Interior (Secretary) shall conduct a review of all Presidential designations or expansions of designations under the Antiquities Act made since January 1, 1996, where the designation covers more than 100,000 acres, where the designation after expansion covers more than 100,000 acres, or where the Secretary determines that the designation or expansion was made without adequate public outreach and coordination with relevant stakeholders, to determine whether each designation or expansion conforms to six policy criteria listed in section 1 of this order. Those criteria are:

(i) the requirements and original objectives of the [Antiquities] Act, including the Act’s requirement that reservations of land not exceed “the smallest area compatible with the proper care and management of the objects to be protected”;

(ii) whether designated lands are appropriately classified under the Act as “historic landmarks, historic and prehistoric structures, [or] other objects of historic or scientific interest”;

(iii) the effects of a designation on the available uses of designated Federal lands, including consideration of the multiple-use policy of section 102(a)(7) of the Federal Land Policy and Management Act (43 U.S.C. 1701(a)(7)), as well as the effects on the available uses of Federal lands beyond the monument boundaries;

(iv) the effects of a designation on the use and enjoyment of non-Federal lands within or beyond monument boundaries;

(v) concerns of State, tribal, and local governments affected by a designation, including the economic development and fiscal condition of affected States, tribes, and localities;

(vi) the availability of Federal resources to properly manage designated areas; and

(vii) such other factors as the Secretary deems appropriate.

=== Affected National Monument Designations ===
On May 5, the Department of Interior announced a public comment period on the review of twenty-two terrestrial national monuments. The Department sought comments for 15 days on Bears Ears National Monument, and 60 days on the other monuments, both beginning on May 11.

Monument	Location	Year(s)	Acreage
Basin and Range National Monument	Nevada	2015	703,585
Bears Ears National Monument	Utah	2016	1,353,000
Berryessa Snow Mountain National Monument	California	2015	330,780
Canyons of the Ancients National Monument	Colorado	2000	175,160
Carrizo Plain National Monument	California	2001	204,107
Cascade–Siskiyou National Monument	Oregon	2000/2017	100,000
Craters of the Moon National Monument and Preserve	Idaho	1924/2000	737,525
Giant Sequoia National Monument	California	2000	327,760
Gold Butte National Monument	Nevada	2016	296,937
Grand Canyon–Parashant National Monument	Arizona	2000	1,014,000
Grand Staircase–Escalante National Monument	Utah	1996	1,700,000
Hanford Reach National Monument	Washington	2000	194,450.93
Ironwood Forest National Monument	Arizona	2000	128,917
Katahdin Woods and Waters National Monument	Maine	2016	87,563
Mojave Trails National Monument	California	2016	1,600,000
Organ Mountains–Desert Peaks National Monument	New Mexico	2014	496,330
Rio Grande del Norte National Monument	New Mexico	2013	242,555
Sand to Snow National Monument	California	2016	154,000
San Gabriel Mountains National Monument	California	2014	346,177
Sonoran Desert National Monument	Arizona	2001	486,149
Upper Missouri River Breaks National Monument	Montana	2001	377,346
Vermilion Cliffs National Monument	Arizona	2000	279,568

The Department of Commerce reviewed five marine monuments according to the criteria of the Executive Order, as well as the mandate of Executive Order 13795 , “Implementing An America-First Offshore Energy Strategy.” Those monuments are:

Monument	Location	Year(s)	Acreage
Marianas Trench Marine National Monument	Commonwealth of the Northern Mariana Islands/Pacific Ocean	2009	60,938,240
Northeast Canyons and Seamounts Marine National Monument	Atlantic Ocean	2016	3,114,320
Pacific Remote Islands Marine National Monument	Pacific Ocean	2009	55,608,320
Papahānaumokuākea Marine National Monument	Hawaii/Pacific Ocean	2006/2016	89,600,000
Rose Atoll Marine National Monument	American Samoa/Pacific Ocean	2009	8,609,045

== Interim report on Bears Ears National Monument ==
Interior Secretary Ryan Zinke gave the interim report requested in the Executive Order to the White House on June 10, 2017. The Secretary recommended shrinking the boundaries of the Bears Ears National Monument, and encouraged Congress to designate national recreation areas, national conservation areas, and cultural areas to be co-managed with tribal governments. In announcing the report, Zinke shared his conclusion that, "There is no doubt that it is drop-dead gorgeous country and that it merits some degree of protection, but designating a monument that — including state land — encompasses almost 1.5 million-acres where multiple-use management is hindered or prohibited is not the best use of the land and is not in accordance with the intention of the Antiquities Act."

== Reception ==
Gregory Korte of the USA Today asks: "Whether one president can nullify a previous president's proclamation establishing a national monument." Senator Orrin Hatch has been a proponent of rolling back some of the Antiquities Act. "We feel that the public, the people that monuments affect, should be considered and that is why the President is asking for a review of the monuments designated in the last 20 years", Zinke said, adding that he believes the review is "long overdue". "It is untested, as you know, whether the president can do that", Zinke said.

Environmental groups, outdoor outfitters and Native American tribes argue that federal protection is not only better for the environment, but better for the economy in a rural, economically depressed area of Utah.

Following Secretary Zinke's interim report, the tribal nations that co-manage Bears Ears National Monument and environmental organizations threatened a lawsuit should the government shrink the monument. Davis Filfred of the Navajo Nation stated, "We don’t want it to be rescinded. We wanted it left alone. Right now, what I’m hearing is this is only a recommendation. But when they do make that move, we’re ready as a Navajo nation for a lawsuit, and all the other tribal leaders are ready. We have others who are ready for litigation. This is uncalled for." Earthjustice attorney Heidi McIntosh stated, "Make no mistake: Unilaterally shrinking the boundaries of Bears Ears National Monument would not only be a slap in the face to the five sovereign tribes who share sacred ties to this land, it would violate both the Antiquities Act and the separation of powers doctrine." The organization is preparing a lawsuit on the matter.

== Subsequent actions ==
On December 4, 2017, President Donald Trump reduced the sizes of Bears Ears and Grand Staircase–Escalante National Monuments, removing protections on about 2.8 million acres of land where mining could resume. Three lawsuits challenged the legality of this action in federal court. On June 5, 2020, Trump signed a proclamation purporting to lift the restrictions on commercial fishing at Northeast Canyons and Seamounts Marine National Monument but without modifying the boundaries. In October 2021 President Joe Biden reversed the three changes. Due to Biden's action, the district court stayed the lawsuits.

== See also ==
- List of executive actions by Donald Trump
