= National Historic Preservation Act =

1966 US law intended to preserve historic sites

- Other short titles: National Historic Preservation Act of 1966
- Long title: An Act to establish a program for the preservation of additional historic properties throughout the Nation, and for other purposes.
- Acronyms (colloquial): NHPA
- Enacted by: the 89th United States Congress
- Effective: October 15, 1966

Citations
- Public law: 89-665
- Statutes at Large: 80 Stat. 915

Codification
- Titles amended: 54 U.S.C.: National Park Service and Related Programs
- U.S.C. sections created: 16 U.S.C. ch. 1A, subch. II; § 470

Legislative history
- Introduced in the Senate as S. 3035 by Henry M. Jackson (D-WA) on March 7, 1966; Committee consideration by Senate Interior and Insular Affairs, House Interior and Insular Affairs; Passed the Senate on July 11, 1966 (passed); Passed the House on October 10, 1966 (passed) with amendment; Senate agreed to House amendment on October 11, 1966 (agreed); Signed into law by President Lyndon B. Johnson on October 15, 1966

The National Historic Preservation Act (NHPA, Pub. L. 89–665, 80 Stat. 915) is legislation intended to preserve historic and archaeological sites in the United States. The act created the National Register of Historic Places, the list of National Historic Landmarks, and the State Historic Preservation Offices.

Senate Bill 3035, the National Historic Preservation Act, was signed into law on October 15, 1966, and is the most far-reaching preservation legislation ever enacted in the United States. Several amendments have been made since. Among other things, the act requires federal agencies to evaluate the impact of all federally funded or permitted projects on historic properties (buildings, archaeological sites, etc.) through a process known as Section 106 Review.

Many of the historic preservation provisions that had been in 16 U.S.C. are present in 54 U.S.C. §§ 300101–320303 by Pub. L. 113–287 (text) (PDF), which was signed into law on December 19, 2014.

== Early development ==
Prior to the 1960s, "historic preservation was," according to a 2015 column in The Washington Post, "neither a public policy issue nor part of America's architectural, planning and real estate development culture. Historic-preservation laws didn't exist." Although there was no national policy regarding preservation until 1966, efforts in the 19th century initiated the journey towards legislation. One of the earliest efforts of the preservation movement occurred around the 1850s. President George Washington's home, Mount Vernon, was in shambles. His nephew attempted to sell it to the federal government for $200,000, but Congress did not authorize such a purchase. To prevent further destruction or conversion of the property to a resort, Ann Pamela Cunningham founded the Mount Vernon Ladies' Association to fight for this house. After establishing the first group promoting preservation efforts, they raised the money to acquire the property and protect it from ruin. Due to their efforts, this house has come to stand to represent the nation and the birth of independence, but it also, "served as a blueprint for later organizations."

In 1906, an act was passed on behalf of the nation's history and land. President Teddy Roosevelt signed the Antiquities Act that "prohibited the excavation of antiquities from public lands without a permit from the Secretary of Interior." It also gave the president authority to declare a specific piece of land a national monument, therefore protecting it from scavengers and proclaiming national identity.

In 1916, the Department of the Interior established a new entity known as the National Park Service, the nation's first agency to regulate and manage public space, including the national monuments. "Over the past fifty years the NPS has acquired more than 26,000,000 acres (110,000 km^{2}) of land, including not only the great chain of parks preserved for their natural beauty and value, but an extraordinary variety of historic buildings, monuments, and sites."

By 1935, Congress passed the Historic Sites Act, which established a national policy for preservation and permitted the Secretary of Interior to create programs on behalf of preservation efforts. During the Great Depression era, the Historic American Buildings Survey (HABS) was established by the Franklin D. Roosevelt Administration. It provided jobs for unemployed architects, engineers, and surveyors. They were charged with surveying, recording, documenting, and interpreting historic properties, creating an invaluable documentation of numerous buildings and other structures. The Historic Sites Act also organized the national parks under the National Park Service, which created the foundation for the future development of the National Register of Historic Places. Although the Antiquities Act and Historic Sites Act were major stepping stones for the preservation movement, these did not create a broad public "national awareness."

On October 26, 1949, President Harry Truman signed legislation creating the National Trust for Historic Preservation "to facilitate public participation in the preservation of sites, buildings, and objects of national significance or international interest." In addition, the law "enforced public participation in preserving and protecting the sites, buildings, objects of national significance in American history." Initially, the National Trust for Historic Preservation did not provide funds for preservation projects. Today, they offer funds for planning and education and provide a plethora of information, techniques, and methods to assist people in carrying out preservation efforts locally.

== Post WWII and urban renewal ==
External videos
- National Historic Preservation Act 50th Anniversary, C-SPAN, 53:41, November 6, 2015

In 1956, President Dwight D. Eisenhower signed the Federal Aid Highway Act of 1956 into law which established the Interstate Highway System, providing an easy and efficient way for troops to depart if under attack. Due to this new construction, many historic properties were destroyed. In the 1960s, President John F. Kennedy launched the Urban Renewal Program. Hoping the plan would rejuvenate the cities, it in fact increased the destruction in the downtown areas. The increase in population around this time, as well, and the manufacturing of cars called for a rapid change, therefore hindering our nation and its culture. "With the urbanization, tear downs, and rebuilding America ... it is destroying the physical evidence of the past." During the 1950s and 1960s, people saw the negative changes in their cities and developed a concern for their "quality of life that reflected their identity."

As a response to the nationwide destruction brought about by federally initiated programs, a report coordinated by Lady Bird Johnson analyzed the country and the effects of urban renewal. With Heritage So Rich, an accumulation of essays, wrote "an expansive inventory of properties reflecting the nation's heritage, a mechanism to protect those properties from unnecessary harm caused by federal activities, a program of financial incentives, and an independent federal preservation body to coordinate the actions of federal agencies affecting historic preservation." The book triggered public awareness of the issue and offered a proposition to handle the situation through the National Historic Preservation Act.

== National Historic Preservation Act ==
The National Historic Preservation Act was signed into law by President Lyndon B. Johnson on October 15, 1966. This act established several institutions: Advisory Council on Historic Preservation, State Historic Preservation Office, National Register of Historic Places, and the Section 106 review process. The Section 106 Process is further explained and defined in 36 CFR 800.

Meeting four times a year, the Advisory Council on Historic Preservation consists of 23 members from both public and private sectors, with the chairman appointed by the president. The council's role is to advise the President and Congress on historic preservation issues, to develop policies and guidelines handling any conflicts of federal agencies, and to participate in the Section 106 review process.

The National Register of Historic Places, overseen by the National Park Service, is the nation's official list of districts, sites, buildings, structures, and objects worthy of preservation, and are officially designated "historic properties" regardless of whether they are archaeological or historic. To be eligible for listing, a property must meet one of four criteria and have sufficient integrity. Being listed on or eligible for listing on the National Register does not automatically prevent damage or destruction but it qualifies these approved properties for grants, loans, and tax incentives. As of 2026, the National Register contains more than 100,000 entries.

The State Historic Preservation Office (SHPO) and Officer was established by the NHPA to coordinate statewide inventory of historic properties, nominate properties to the National Register, maintain a statewide preservation plan, assist others, and advise and educate locals. There are a total of 59 SHPO officers, one for each state with eight additional ones, which include the District of Columbia, Puerto Rico, the Virgin Islands, and others.

== Section 106 review process ==
Section 106 of the National Historic Preservation Act mandates federal agencies undergo a review process for all federally funded and permitted projects that will impact sites listed on, or eligible for listing on, the National Register of Historic Places. Specifically it requires the federal agency to "take into account" the effect a project may have on historic properties. It allows interested parties an opportunity to comment on the potential impact projects may have on significant archaeological or historic sites. The main purpose for the establishment of the Section 106 review process is to minimize potential harm and damage to historic properties.

Any federal agency whose project, funding or permit may affect a historic property, both those listed or eligible for inclusion in the National Register of Historic Places, must consider the effects on historic properties and "seek ways to avoid, minimize or mitigate" any adverse effects on historic properties. The typical Section 106 Review involves four primary steps: 1 - Initiation of the Section 106 Review; 2 - Identification of Historic Properties; 3 - Assessment of Adverse Effects; and 4 - Resolution of Adverse Effects. Further steps may be required if there is a disagreement among the consulting parties on adverse effects or the resolution of the effects.

The federal agency overseeing the project inventories the project area (or contracts with a qualified consultant) to determine the presence or absence of historic properties. They then submit to the SHPO a Determination of Effect/Finding of Effect (DOE/FOE) outlining to the SHPO the project, the efforts taken to identify historic properties, and what effects, if any, the project may have on historic properties. If the project is believed to have no adverse effect on eligible historic resources and the SHPO and other consulting parties agree, then the Section 106 process is effectively closed and the project may proceed. Alternatively, if an adverse effect is expected, the agency is required to work with the local State Historic Preservation Office to ensure that all interested parties are given an opportunity to review the proposed work and provide comments. This step seeks ways for the project to avoid having an adverse effect on historic properties. Ideally, a Memorandum of Agreement is reached between all consulting parties outlining agreed to mitigation or avoidance of historic properties, but this is not always the case. Without this process historical properties would lose a significant protection. This process helps decide different approaches and solutions to the project, but does not prevent any site from demolition or alteration.

Section 107 of the National Historic Preservation Act exempts three Washington, D.C., National Historic Landmarks from Section 106 review: the White House, the United States Capitol, and the United States Supreme Court Building.

In 2026, the Trump administration began an effort to overhaul Section 106 regulations. On July 24, 2026, the Advisory Council on Historic Preservation voted to advance rule changes for White House review intended to "modify, clarify and streamline" guidance to federal agencies.

== Motives ==
Early preservation efforts were driven by patriotism and a desire to protect the new establishment of the nation by wealthy, private individuals. Early efforts focused primarily on individual structures as opposed to areas such as a neighborhood in a city or a rural landscape. The preserved structures were often turned into museums to create a showcase and generate tourism. The focus of preservation eventually shifted from patriotism to the aesthetics of a structure or area and ultimately to their structural relationships with society at large. According to Robin Elizabeth Datel, modern motivations for preservation can be summed up in four points:

- to retain diverse elements of past
- to perpetuate the distinctive identities of places
- to involve amateurs in landscape care
- to practice a conservation approach to environmental change.

The economic benefits of preservation continue to become more important and better understood and documented. Preservation efforts produce the most jobs in the nation's economy and these jobs create new businesses and tourism, increase property values, and enhance the quality of life in a community.

== Effects ==
The National Historic Preservation Act has led to major changes in the employment trends in historic preservation fields. Archaeologists, historians, historic architects, and others have been employed in vast numbers in the field of cultural resource management. Cultural resource management is an umbrella term that encompasses archaeology, historic preservation and other disciplines when employed for the purposes of compliance with NHPA and other federal and state-mandated historic preservation laws.

Prior to the passage and subsequent enforcement (through litigation) of the National Historic Preservation Act of 1966 and other laws, most archaeologists, (architectural) historians, and other historic preservation specialists were employed primarily in the field of academia, working at universities or other places of higher learning. However, since the passage of the NHPA, ever-increasing numbers of these professionals are employed in support of the cultural resources management industry. Large public works projects often require that teams of archaeologists perform limited excavations in order to properly inventory buried archaeological remains and assess their eligibility for the National Register of Historic Places. This industry has also allowed a larger swath of individuals to participate in archaeology and history as, unlike in the academic arena, a PhD is not required to earn a professional livelihood.

The Secretary of the Interior's Professional Qualification Standards for archeologists require a graduate degree plus at least one year of full-time experience, at least four months of fieldwork, and demonstrated ability to carry research to completion. Additionally, the basic field work often required in support of performing inventories of cultural resources is conducted by individuals with or earning bachelor's degrees. As a result, many undergraduates and recent graduates in the fields which support the implementation of the National Historic Preservation Act have found gainful employment. In the past, they stood little chance of earning a living in these fields without an advanced degree. However, Cultural Resource Management (CRM) is still one of the lowest paying fields for educated professionals.

== See also ==
- Tribal Historic Preservation Officer
