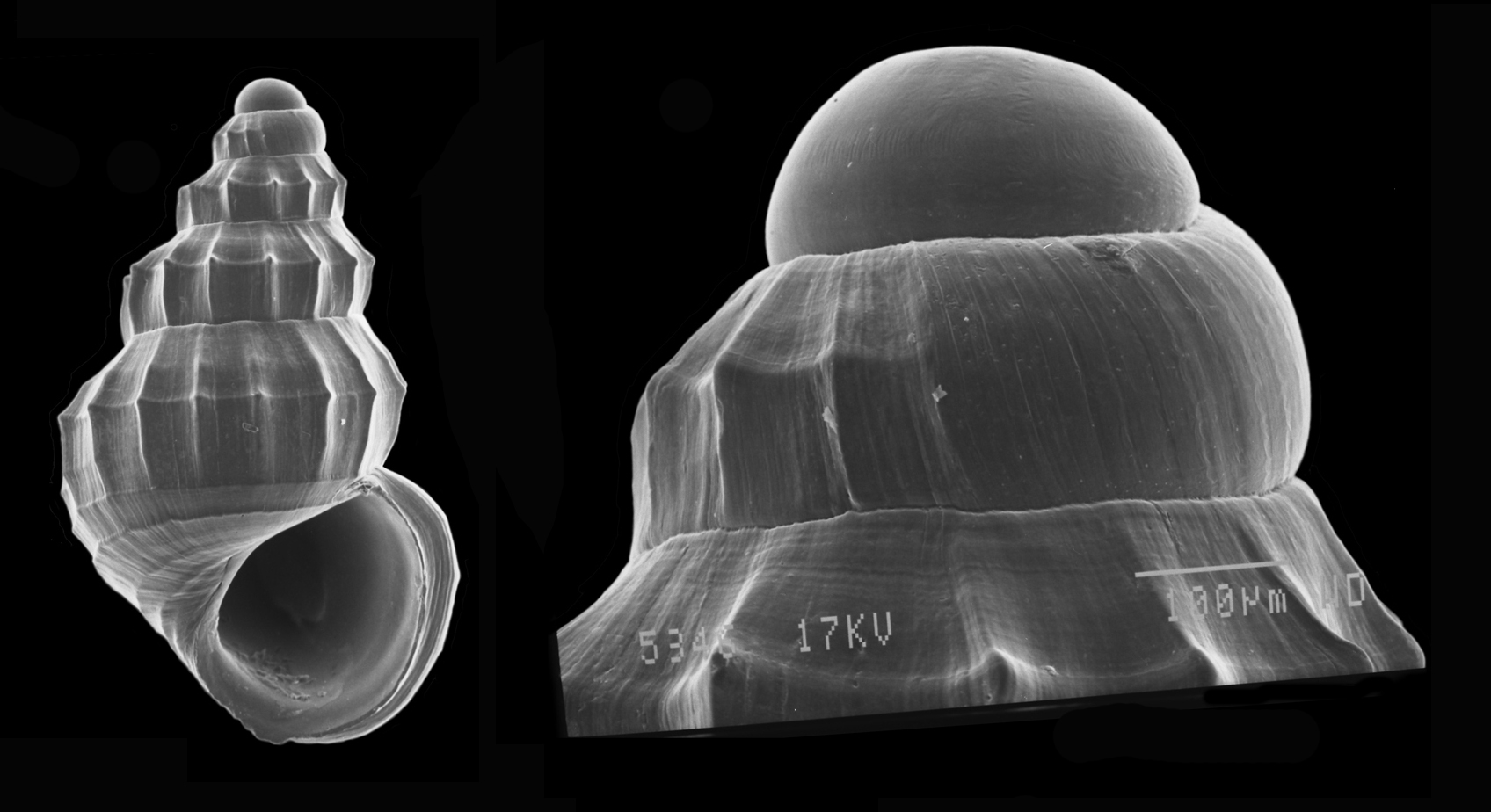
- Shell of Alvania suroiti (holotype at MNHN, Paris)

Scientific classification
- Kingdom: Animalia
- Phylum: Mollusca
- Class: Gastropoda
- Subclass: Caenogastropoda
- Order: Littorinimorpha
- Family: Rissoidae
- Genus: Alvania
- Species: A. suroiti

Binomial name
- Alvania suroiti Gofas, 2007

= Alvania suroiti =

Species of gastropod

Alvania suroiti is a species of minute sea snail, a marine gastropod mollusc or micromollusc in the family Rissoidae.

== Description ==
The shell attains a length of 2.14 mm.

== Distribution ==
This species is found on the Great Meteor and Hyères seamounts in the North Atlantic, commonly at a depth of 330–480 m.
