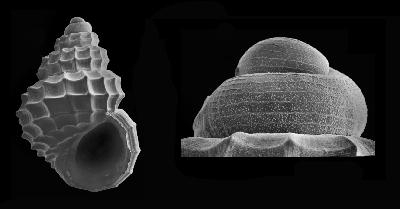
- Shell of Alvania elenae (holotype at MNHN, Paris)

Scientific classification
- Kingdom: Animalia
- Phylum: Mollusca
- Class: Gastropoda
- Subclass: Caenogastropoda
- Order: Littorinimorpha
- Superfamily: Rissooidea
- Family: Rissoidae
- Genus: Alvania
- Species: A. elenae

Binomial name
- Alvania elenae Gofas, 2007

= Alvania elenae =

Species of gastropod

Alvania elenae is a species of minute sea snail, a marine gastropod mollusc or micromollusc in the family Rissoidae.

== Description ==
It has a solid and translucent shell with a moderately high spire, reaching up to 2.8 mm in height and 1.9 mm in width. The length of the shell attains 2.56 mm. Its protoconch has approximately 1.5 convex whorls, whereas its teleoconch has 3.5 whorls.

The outer lip is orthocline, thickened, and ornamented internally with five to six denticles, while the inner lip is thick and appressed to the preceding whorl.

== Distribution ==
This marine species occurs on the Great Meteor Seamount and Hyères Seamount, Northeast Atlantic Ocean. Its found in deep-sea seamount habitats, which are often rich in micromollusc biodiversity. The species has been recorded at depths between approximately 305-407 meters.
