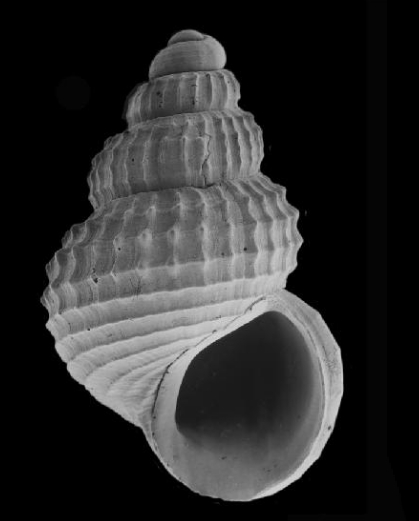
- Shell of Alvania microtuberculata (holotype at MNHN, Paris)

Scientific classification
- Kingdom: Animalia
- Phylum: Mollusca
- Class: Gastropoda
- Subclass: Caenogastropoda
- Order: Littorinimorpha
- Superfamily: Rissooidea
- Family: Rissoidae
- Genus: Alvania
- Species: A. microtuberculata

Binomial name
- Alvania microtuberculata Gofas, 2007

= Alvania microtuberculata =

Species of gastropod

Alvania microtuberculata is a species of minute sea snail, a marine gastropod mollusc or micromollusc in the family Rissoidae.

== Description ==
The length of the shell attains 2.4 mm.

== Distribution ==
This species occurs in the Atlantic Ocean on the Atlantis Seamount.
