= John Nau =

John Nau may refer to:

- John L. Nau, American businessman
- John Antoine Nau (1860–1918), French poet and writer
