= State Historic Preservation Office =

State function aimed at preserving historical sites

The State Historic Preservation Office (SHPO) is a U.S. state or territorial governmental function described by the United States federal government in 1966 under Section 101 of the National Historic Preservation Act (NHPA). As described in that law, the purposes of a SHPO include surveying and recognizing historic properties, reviewing nominations for properties to be included in the National Register of Historic Places, reviewing undertakings for the impact on the properties as well as supporting federal organizations, state and local governments, and private sector. The Federal law cannot force a state to create a SHPO, but to obtain several benefits under the law, a state needs to do so (or designate one of its existing agencies for these tasks). As each state is responsible for setting up their own SHPO, each SHPO may vary in rules and regulations. To link these differences with the SHPOs, the National Conference of State Historic Preservation Officers (NCSHPO) was created as a "point of contact" according to the National Historic Preservation Act.

== History ==
In 1966, the National Historic Preservation Act (NHPA) was put into effect. As part of the Congressional Act, Section 101 implemented the designation of the State Historic Preservation Program. State Liaison Officers, which later became known as State Historic Preservation Officers, were established to manage historic preservation grants for the National Park Service (NPS). In the 1970s, these SHPOs experienced a growth in power as they became more organized, efficient and professional, and clarified their relationships with NPS.

They also formed a National Conference of State Historic Preservation Officers to represent them on a National level, particularly in Washington. The SHPO continued to gain an increasingly specific role, taking on the position of the advising consultant for the Section 106 review process. In 1980 with the amendment to the NHPA, the SHPO's exact duties were finally identified, defining its role, which remains today.

== Purposes ==
The responsibilities of the State Historic Preservation Office, according to the National Historic Preservation Act of 1966, as amended, include running the State Historic Preservation Program and, as stated in the Act:

1. In cooperation with Federal and State agencies, local governments, and private organizations and individuals, direct and conduct a comprehensive statewide survey of historic properties and maintain inventories of such properties;
2. Identify and nominate eligible properties to the National Register and otherwise administer applications for listing historic properties on the National register;
3. Prepare and implement a comprehensive statewide historic preservation plan;
4. Administer the State program of Federal assistance for historic preservation within the State;
5. Advise and assist, as appropriate, Federal and State agencies and local governments in carrying out their historic preservation responsibilities;
6. Cooperate with the Secretary, the Advisory Council on Historic Preservation, and other Federal and State agencies, local governments, and organizations and individuals to ensure historic properties are taken into consideration at all levels of planning and development; }Provide public information, education and training, and technical assistance relating to the Federal and State Historic Preservation Programs; and
7. Cooperate with local governments in the development of the local historic preservation programs and assist local governments in becoming certified pursuant to subsection (C).

Definitions "Comprehensive Statewide Historic preservation plan" – The official plan assumed by local governments throughout the state, that guides decision making over proposed public and private actions affecting community development. View an example here.

"Secretary" refers to the Secretary of the Interior in the Department of the Interior.

"Historic Preservation Program" – A program designed to support and promote historic preservation interests and priorities. There are National, Federal and State Preservation Programs, each tailored to suit the needs at each particular level.

"Certified local government"- For a city or town's local government to become certified, it has to meet particular standards so that it can participate in certain NHPA programs.

== SHPO among states ==
SHPOs exist not only in 50 states, but also in the District of Columbia, Puerto Rico, American Samoa, the Virgin Islands, Guam, the Commonwealth of the Northern Mariana Islands, the Republic of Palau, the Republic of Marshall Islands, and the Federated States of Micronesia; making 59 SHPOs total. Each State Historic Preservation Office is responsible for effective planning to address preservation matters. For example, agricultural structures such as barns are significant to New Hampshire's "values of heritage, hard work, productivity and stewardship" and the state has devoted special programs to help preserve these values.

In Florida, Art Deco buildings in South Beach are considered significant to the state. As a result of these differences, states have expanded and/or specialized their SHPO purposes and created private organizations. Alaska's Coastal Management Program is a private organization, created by the state to regulate agencies to acknowledge environmental and cultural resources within the Alaskan Coast and protect them.

== THPO ==
Tribal Historic Preservation Officers (THPOs) assume "some or all of the functions of State Historic Preservation Officers on Tribal lands."

== NCSHPO ==
The National Conference of State Historic Preservation Officers (NCSHPO) is a non-profit organization for State Historic Preservation Officers (SHPO). It serves as a way of contacting the SHPOs as well as a way for the SHPOs to communicate with each other. The mission of the NCSHPO is to act as a national representative for the SHPOs, especially when it comes to representing their interests in Washington.

The NCSHPO meets once a year and participants include not only SHPOs, but members of Preservation Action and the National Alliance of Preservation Commissions, National Trust for Historic Preservation Advisors and federal agencies. Participants are updated on important legislative issues and then visit Capitol Hill with the information, to meet with their representatives and senators to establish favorable positions on these issues.

Generally the president of the NCSHPO is a previous member of the Advisory Council on Historic Preservation (ACHP) while the Board of Directors, which governs NCSHPO, is elected by the member states and meets more frequently than once a year. It acts as a representative for them with federal agencies and national preservation organizations. It is important to have a close relationship with these federal agencies and national organizations, and NCSHPO maintains these by partnering closely with organizations such as: The ACHP, the National Park Service, the National Trust for Historic Preservation and Preservation Action.

== See also ==
- Save America's Treasures
- Tribal Historic Preservation Officer
