= Massachusetts Lobstermen's Association v. Ross =

U.S. District Court case

Massachusetts Lobstermen's Association v. Ross (Docket No. 1:17-cv-00406-JEB), later Massachusetts Lobstermen's Association v. Raimondo (18-5353), is a United States District Court case in the District of Columbia in which the court determined whether or not a President may establish a marine national monument, the Northeast Canyons and Seamounts Marine National Monument, under the authority of the Antiquities Act of 1906. The case represents the first time that the President's authority to create an offshore marine monument under the Act was directly challenged in court. The District Court upheld the President's authority to designate the monument under the authority bestowed by the Antiquities Act. The case was appealed to the D.C. Circuit (Docket No. 18-05353), which upheld the District Court's ruling.

== History ==
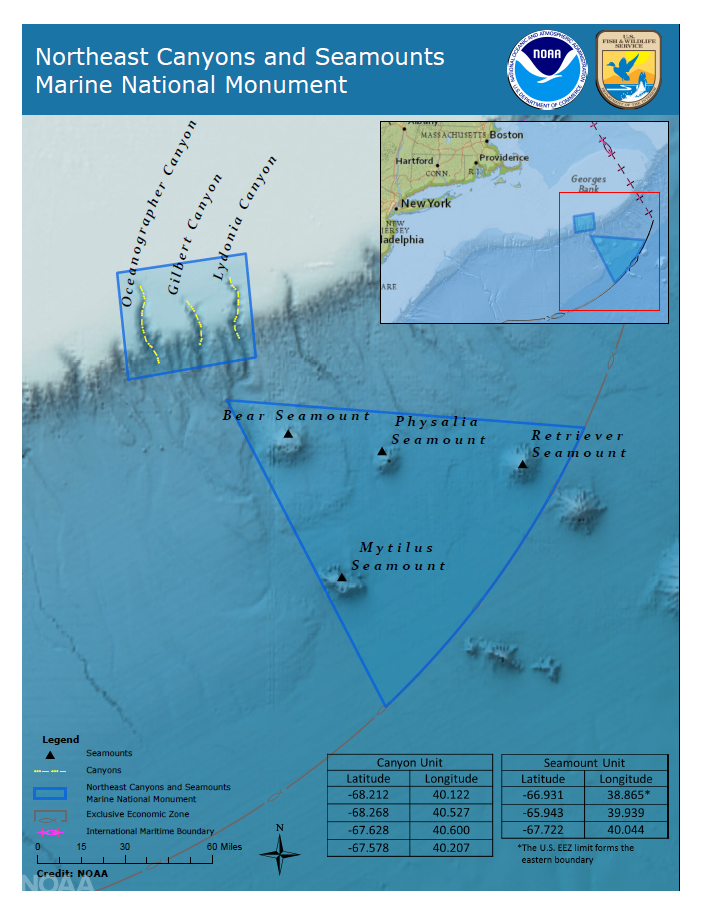
Northeast Canyons and Seamounts Marine National Monument boundaries.

On September 15, 2016, President Obama issued a Presidential Proclamation creating the Northeast Canyons and Seamounts Marine National Monument. As the first marine national monument in the Atlantic Ocean, it consists of approximately 4,913 square miles (12,724 square kilometers) and is located about 130 miles east-southeast of Cape Cod in an area of the ocean known as the United States’ Exclusive Economic Zone (EEZ).

The monument includes two distinct areas. The first area covers three underwater canyons—Oceanographer, Gilbert, and Lydonia—spanning roughly 941 square miles. The second area covers four distinct seamounts—Bear, Physalia, Retriever, and Mytilus—encompassing 3,972 square miles. Collectively, the monument is approximately the size of Connecticut.

The canyons and seamounts are celebrated for their rich biological diversity. The steep slopes of the canyons and seamounts interact with oceanographic currents to create localized eddies, causing upwelling. The currents lift nutrients to surface waters, fueling an outburst of phytoplankton and zooplankton that form the base of the food chain. These plankton draw large schools of small fish, and those fish draw even larger predators such as whales, sharks, tunas and seabirds to the area. In all, “the geology, currents, and productivity create diverse and vibrant ecosystems.” As a result, the area has been the subject of “intense scientific interest” and discovery since the 1970s.

President Obama's proclamation directs the Secretaries of Commerce and Interior to develop plans within three years for the “proper care and management” of the monument. Further, the proclamation prohibits oil, gas and mineral exploration, and most commercial fishing within the monument's boundaries.

In response to the monument's designation, several commercial fishing associations filed a lawsuit against the federal government in March 2017. They claimed injury from the restrictions on commercial fishing, and sought declaratory and injunctive relief from the President, the Secretaries of Commerce and Interior, and the Chairman of the Council on Environmental Quality.

== Parties and amici curiae ==
The plaintiffs in this case include the Massachusetts Lobstermen's Association, the Atlantic Offshore Lobstermen's Association, the Long Island Commercial Fishing Association, the Garden State Seafood Association and the Rhode Island Fishermen's Alliance. They are represented by the Pacific Legal Foundation. Secretary Ross, Benjamin Friedman of NOAA, Secretary Zinke and Donald Trump are all named defendants. Several conservationist groups including the Natural Resources Defense Council, Earthjustice, the Conservation Law Foundation, and the Center for Biological Diversity also participated as intervenors in support of the federal government.

The court also received two separate amicus briefs from groups of law professors. The first was prepared by Professors Alison Rieser, Donna R. Christie, and Josh Eagle, and focused on principles of international law of the sea. The second was prepared by Professors Robin Kundis Craig, Randall S. Abate, Robert T. Anderson, Bret Birdsong, Victor B. Flatt, Richard Hildreth, Blake Hudson, Cymie R. Payne, Zygmunt J.B. Plater, Edward P. Richards, Keith W. Rizzardi, Stephen E. Roady, and Rachael E. Salcido, and focused on how the Antiquities Act applies to submerged lands under domestic law. Both briefs concluded that the creation of the Northeast Canyons and Seamounts Marine National Monument was consistent with the President's authority under the Antiquities Act.

== Legal issues ==
The key legal issue addressed in the case is whether or not the President has the authority under the Antiquities Act to create the Northeast Canyons and Seamounts Marine National Monument.

The Antiquities Act authorizes the President of the United States, in their discretion, to declare “objects of historic or scientific interest that are situated on land owned or controlled by the Federal Government to be national monuments.” It further authorizes the President to “reserve parcels of land as a part of the national monuments.” Any parcel must be “confined to the smallest area compatible with the proper care and management of the objects to be protected.”

In asserting their case, the plaintiffs argued that the President lacked the authority under the Antiquities Act to declare the Northeast Canyons and Seamounts a national monument. They put forward three main arguments. First, they argued that the submerged lands of the Canyons and Seamounts are not “lands” within the meaning of the Antiquities Act. Secondly, they argued that the federal government does not “control” the lands on which the Canyons and Seamounts lie under the meaning of the Act. Finally, they argued that the amount of land reserved as part of the monument is not the smallest compatible with its management.

The government sought dismissal of the case under rules 12(b)(1) and 12(b)(6) of the Federal Rules of Civil Procedure on the grounds that the case is not judicially reviewable and that the President did not exceed his statutory authority under the Antiquities Act. The conservationist-intervenors filed a response in support of the federal defendant's motion to dismiss, but argued separately that while the court may review a Presidential monument proclamation, the court should dismiss the plaintiff's complaint because it fails to state a claim for relief under the Federal Rules of Civil Procedure 12(b)(6).

== Ruling ==
The case was decided by United States District Court for the District of Columbia Judge James E. Boasberg, who on October 5, 2018, granted the government's motion to dismiss the case. In doing so, the court made four important holdings. Firstly, the court rejected the contention that presidential exercise of authority to designate a national monument is not judicially reviewable. Secondly, the court held that the term “lands” within the Act includes the submerged lands of the ocean floor. Thirdly, the court held that the federal government adequately controls the United States’ Exclusive Economic Zone for the purposes of the Act. Finally, the court held that the plaintiffs did not sufficiently demonstrate that the Monument is too large.

== Legal significance ==
The Supreme Court has upheld or discussed the application of the Antiquities Act to the submerged lands of three different national monuments along the American coastline and inland water bodies, however, they have not yet ruled on the application of the Antiquities Act to marine monument designations located exclusively beyond the territorial sea. The District Court's holding represents the first time a court has squarely considered whether the President has the authority under the Antiquities Act to create a marine national monument located entirely within the United States’ Exclusive Economic Zone, which extends beyond the territorial sea.

== Subsequent litigation ==
In December 2018 the plaintiffs notified the District Court of their decision to appeal the case. The plaintiff-appellants filed their opening brief at the D.C. Circuit on April 8, 2019. Defendant-appellees and intervenors submitted their reply briefs on May 29, 2019. The D.C. Circuit affirmed the District Court on December 27, 2019. The Supreme Court denied certiorari on March 22, 2021.

== Related litigation ==
Although litigating a separate issue under the Antiquities Act, this District Court opinion has already been cited by litigants on both sides of the ongoing dispute over President Trump's reduction of Bears Ears National Monument and Grand Staircase–Escalante National Monument. The litigants each use the case to advance differing views of Presidential discretion and authority under the Act. For example, the opinion was used to support the argument that the President has broad discretion under the Antiquities Act to both create and shrink a national monument, and for the notion that Congressional acquiescence to Presidential action is germane to a court's consideration of the President's authority under the Act. The opinion has also been cited to emphasize that the President's authority under the Act is bound by the Act's preservationist purpose, and therefore is not unlimited.
