= ACHP =

ACHP may refer to:

- Advisory Council on Historic Preservation, an independent US Federal agency that promotes the preservation, enhancement, and productive use of the nation's historic resources
- African Charter on Human and Peoples' Rights, an international human rights instrument that seeks to promote and protect human rights and basic freedoms in the African continent
