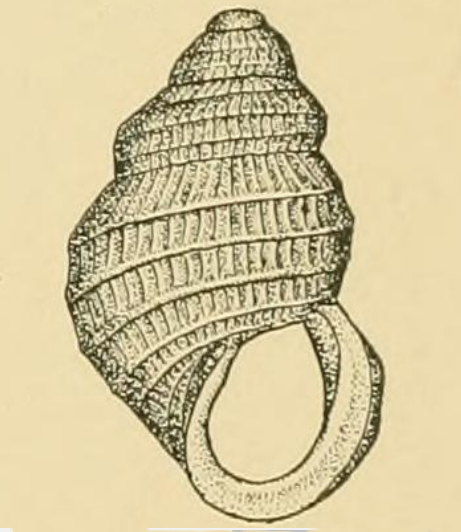
- Shell of Alvania minuscula (holotype)

Scientific classification
- Kingdom: Animalia
- Phylum: Mollusca
- Class: Gastropoda
- Subclass: Caenogastropoda
- Order: Littorinimorpha
- Superfamily: Rissooidea
- Family: Rissoidae
- Genus: Alvania
- Species: A. minuscula

Binomial name
- Alvania minuscula (A. E. Verrill & K. J. Bush, 1900)

Synonyms
- Rissoa (Manzonia) minuscula A. E. Verrill & K. J. Bush, 1900 superseded combination

= Alvania minuscula =

Species of gastropod

Alvania minuscula is a species of small sea snail, a marine gastropod mollusc or micromollusc in the family Rissoidae.

== Description ==
The length of the shell attains 2.1 mm, its diameter 1.2 mm.

(Original description) The very minute shell is ovate and pale yellowish brown. It consists of five whorls besides the small, mammillary, apical whorl. The whorls are convex in the middle. Those of the spire are crossed by three revolving cingula and covered by numerous, fine, elevated, longitudinal ribs, most distinct in the grooves between the cingula and on the subsutural area, giving the surface a finely cancellated appearance under the microscope. These ribs do not interrupt the stronger revolving lines. The body whorl is relatively large and has three or four smaller, additional revolving cingula below the periphery, the last of which circumscribes the narrow and shallow umbilical chink. The aperture is round-ovate with a strongly thickened margin, supported by a well-developed marginal rib.

== Distribution ==
This species occurs in the Atlantic Ocean on the Atlantis Seamount.
