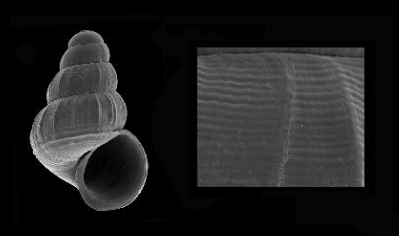
- Shell of Alvania macella (holotype at MNHN, Paris)

Scientific classification
- Kingdom: Animalia
- Phylum: Mollusca
- Class: Gastropoda
- Subclass: Caenogastropoda
- Order: Littorinimorpha
- Superfamily: Rissooidea
- Family: Rissoidae
- Genus: Alvania
- Species: A. macella

Binomial name
- Alvania macella Gofas, 2007

= Alvania macella =

Species of gastropod

Alvania macella is a species of minute sea snail, a marine gastropod mollusc or micromollusc in the family Rissoidae.

== Distribution ==
This species occurs in the Atlantic Ocean on the Atlantis Seamount.
