= Calliostoma heugteni =

Scientific classification
- Kingdom: Animalia
- Phylum: Mollusca
- Class: Gastropoda
- Subclass: Vetigastropoda
- Order: Trochida
- Family: Calliostomatidae
- Genus: Calliostoma
- Species: C. heugteni

Binomial name
- Calliostoma heugteni Vilvens & Swinnen, 2003

Species of gastropod

Calliostoma heugteni is a species of sea snail, a marine gastropod mollusk in the family Calliostomatidae.

== Distribution ==
This species occurs in the Atlantic Ocean, south of the Azores, off the Great Meteor Seamount.
