= New England Seamounts =

Chain of more than 20 seamounts in the Atlantic Ocean

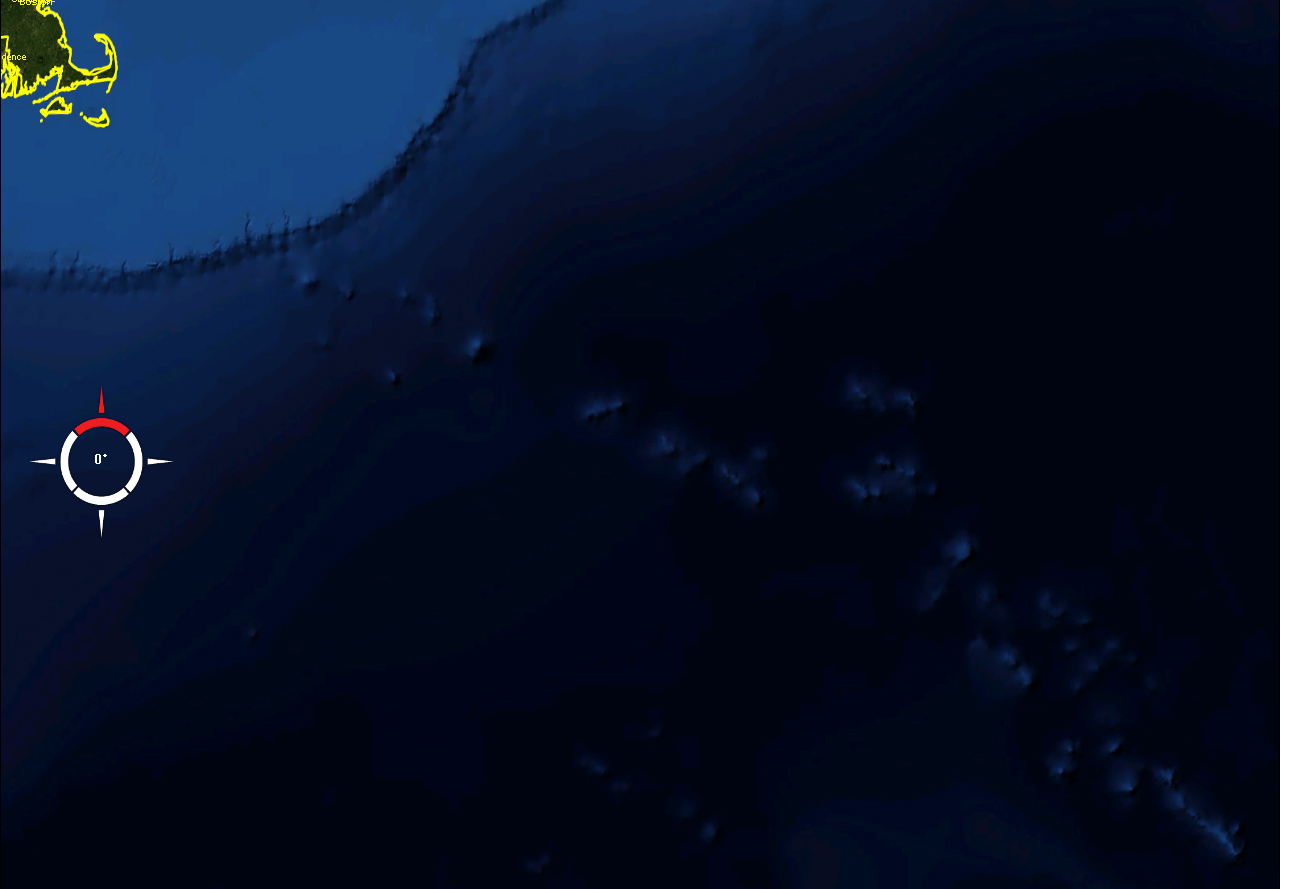

- Location within North Atlantic

Location
- Coordinates: 37°24′N 60°00′W

The New England Seamounts is a chain of over twenty underwater extinct volcanic mountains known as seamounts.

This chain of seamounts is located off the coast of Massachusetts in the Atlantic Ocean and extends over 1,000 kilometers (600 mi) from the edge of Georges Bank. Many of the peaks of these mountains rise over 4,000 meters (13,000 ft) from the seabed. The New England Seamounts chain is the longest such chain in the North Atlantic and is home to a diverse range of deep sea fauna. Scientists have visited the chain on various occasions to survey the geologic makeup and biota of the region. The chain is part of the Great Meteor hotspot track and was formed by the movement of the North American Plate over the New England hotspot. The oldest volcanoes that were formed by the same hotspot are northwest of Hudson Bay, Canada. Part of the seamount chain is protected by Northeast Canyons and Seamounts Marine National Monument.

A variety of different names have been used to refer to this seamount range, including the Kelvin Seamounts, Kelvin Seamount Group, Kelvin Banks, New England Seamount Chain and the Bermuda-New England Seamount Arc (including the Bermuda Pedestal, which contains the archipelago of Bermuda and Argus and Challenger Banks, and Bowditch Seamount, and other seamounts intervening roughly between Bermuda and Nashville Seamount).

== Formation ==
The New England hotspot, also referred to as the Great Meteor hotspot, formed the White Mountains 124 to 100 million years ago when the North American continent was directly over the zone. As the continent drifted to the west, the hotspot gradually moved offshore. On a southeasterly course, the hotspot formed Bear Seamount, the oldest seamount in the chain, about 100 to 103 million years ago. Over the course of millions of years, the hotspot continued to create the other seamounts in the chain, culminating about 83 million years ago with the creation of the Nashville Seamount. As the Atlantic Ocean continued to spread, the hotspot eventually "travelled" further east, forming the Great Meteor Seamount south of the Azores, where it is located today. The New England Seamounts were once at or above sea level. As time passed, however, and the chain moved farther away from the New England hotspot, the crust cooled and contracted, and the chain sank into the ocean. All the peaks are now a kilometer or more below the surface.

== Biota ==
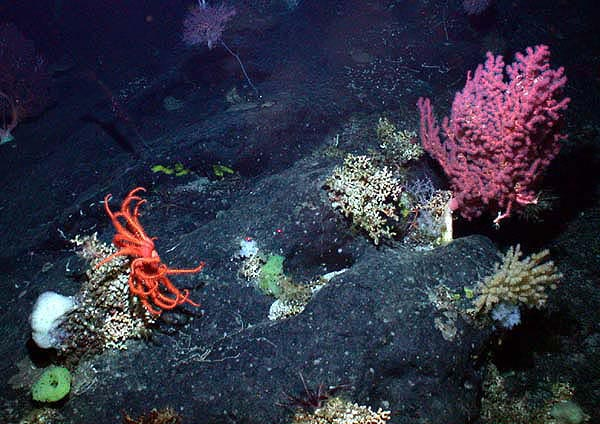
Some animals from the New England Seamounts: gorgonian soft coral, a brisingid sea star, and sponges

The seamount chain provides a unique habitat for deep sea marine creatures. Coral formations grow on the rocky outcrops, resembling underwater forests that provide shelter for invertebrates and fish. Due to the expense and difficulties of studying the deep ocean, little was known of the creatures that inhabited the New England Seamounts. In fact, before recent expeditions, there was only one known coral species in the entire chain. Since 2000, marine biologists, during various exploratory studies, have caught and classified over 203 species of fish and 214 species of invertebrates on the Bear Seamount. This range of diversity suggests that other seamounts may harbour more unknown macro-organisms. During one survey, a species of cutthroat eel, believed to be found only near Australia, was identified. Corals, echinoderms, and crustaceans make up a large portion of the creatures found on the seamount. These organisms act as indicator species, identifying potential problems in the ecosystem.

== Seamounts ==
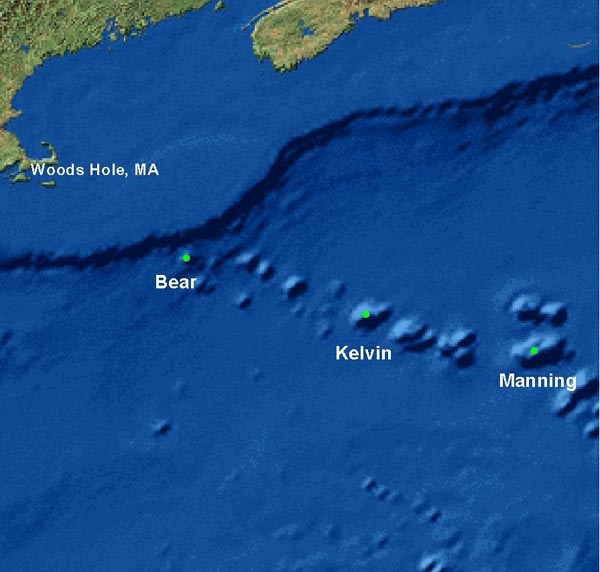
Map of the New England Seamounts showing the locations of Bear, Kelvin and Manning seamounts

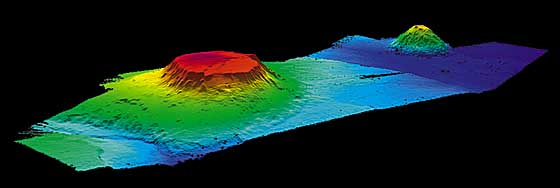
3D depiction of Bear Seamount, with Physalia Seamount in the background

The New England Seamounts include:

- Allegheny Seamount 36°52′7.6″N 58°44′16.4″W
- Asterias Seamount 38°53′56″N 65°17′59.8″W
- Balanus Seamount 39°22′58.8″N 65°22′47.3″W
- Bear Seamount (National Monument) 39°55′N 67°24′W
- Buell Seamount 39°3′46.6″N 66°24′0.3″W
- Gerda Seamount 36°14′13.8″N 57°29′56.1″W
- Gilliss Seamount
- Gosnold Seamount (guyot) 38°6′55.2″N 62°15′54.9″W
- Gregg Seamount (guyot)
- Hodgson Seamount 35°34′56.8″N 58°40′0″W
- Kelvin Seamount (guyot) 39°19′6.5″N 64°31′21.1″W
- Kiwi Seamount 39°19′6.5″N 64°31′21.1″W
- Manning Seamount 38°9′54.5″N 60°40′0″W
- Michael Seamount 36°21′56.6″N 58°21′2.2″W
- Mytilus Seamount (National Monument) 39°21′37.2″N 67°8′48.2″W
- Nashville Seamount 34°59′59.7″N 57°21′3.7″W
- Panulirus Seamount 38°28′1.6″N 64°47′11.6″W
- Picket Seamount 39°38′9.9″N 65°58′52.8″W
- Physalia Seamount (National Monument) 39°48′18.3″N 66°52′45.6″W
- Rehoboth Seamount (guyot) 37°32′5.3″N 59°55′59.3″W
- Retriever Seamount (National Monument) 39°47′37.6″N 66°14′41.3″W
- San Pablo Seamount 38°56′23.3″N 60°27′25.8″W
- Sheldrake Seamount 38°26′29.5″N 62°5′9″W
- Vogel Seamount (guyot) 37°13′41.1″N 60°14′48.2″W

== See also ==
- New England hotspot
- Corner Rise Seamounts
- Seewarte Seamounts
