= National monument (United States) =

Monuments assigned protected status by presidents of the US

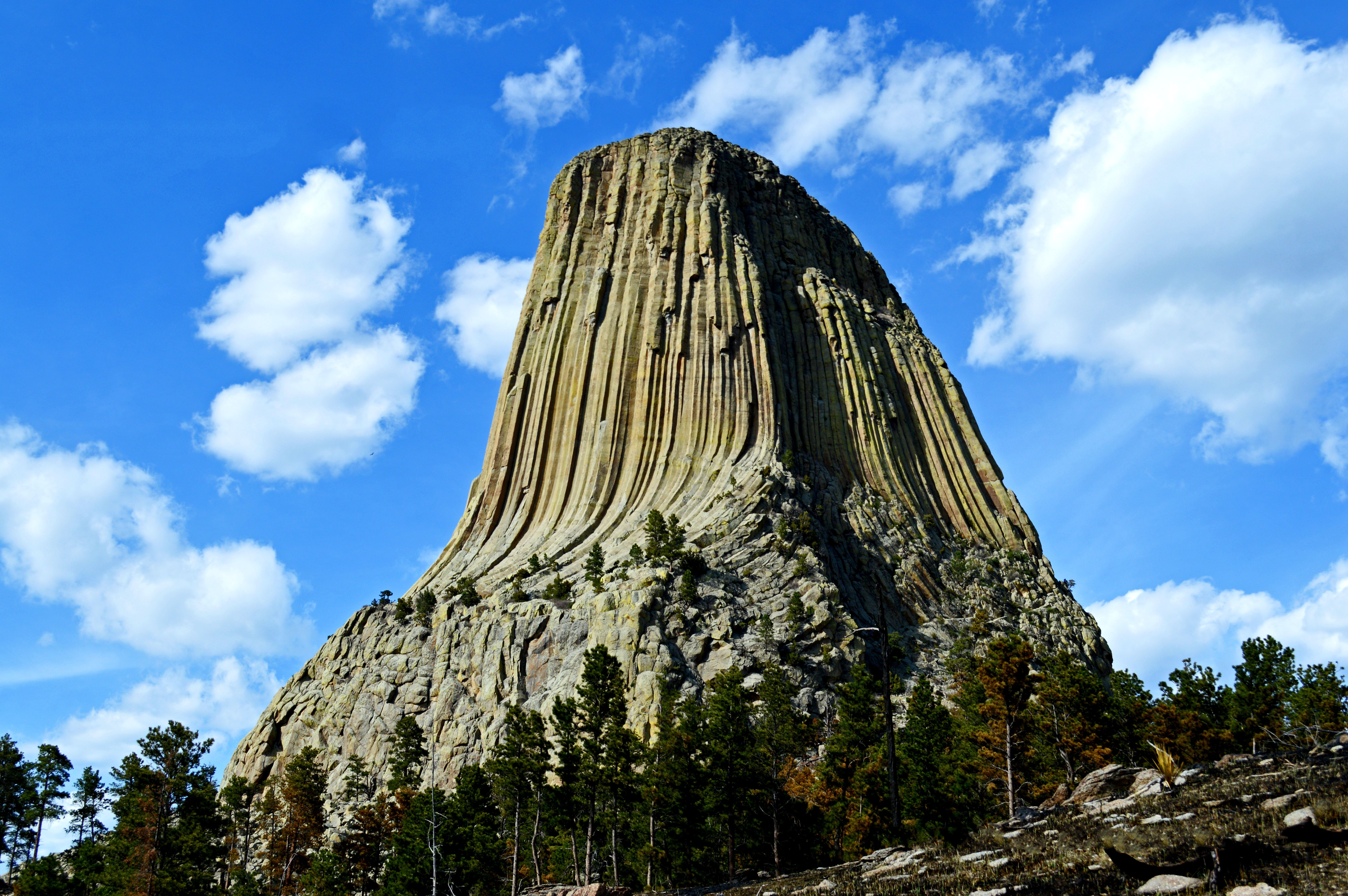
Devils Tower National Monument, Wyoming

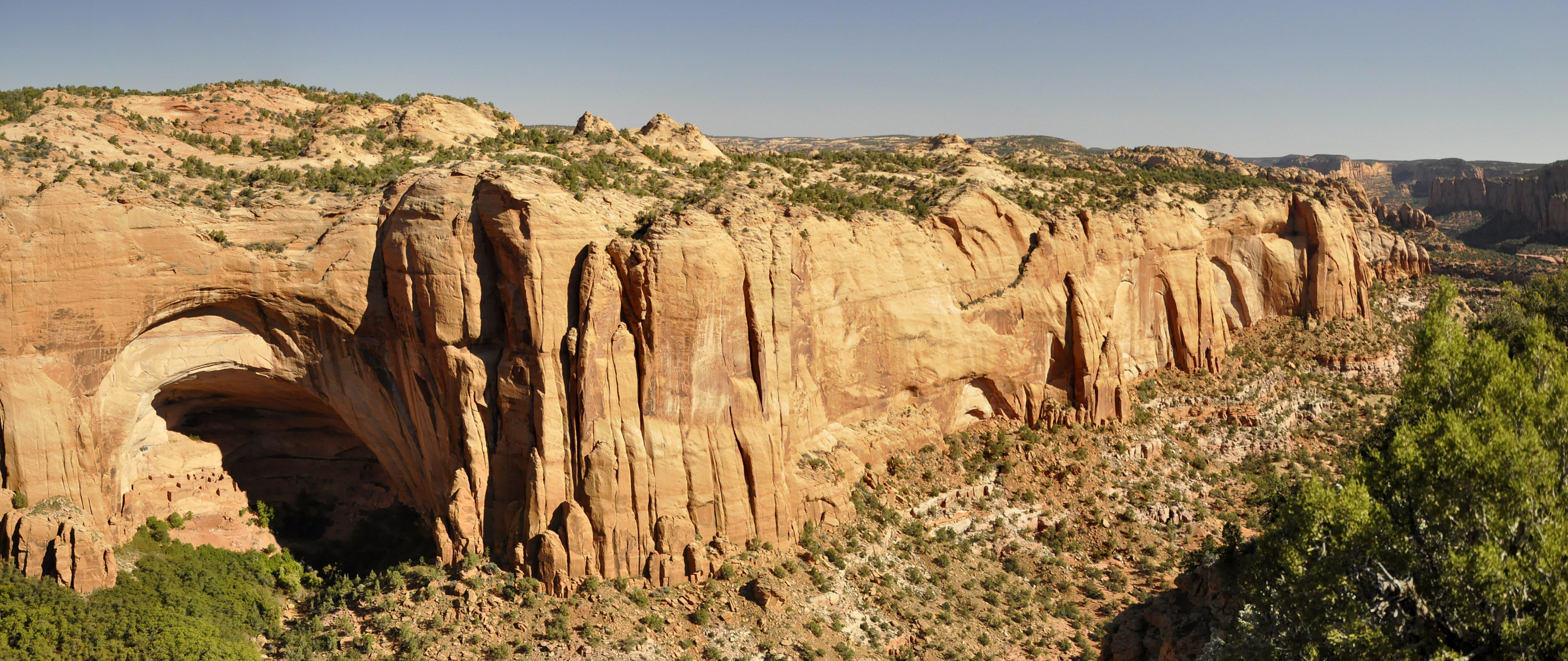
Navajo National Monument, Arizona

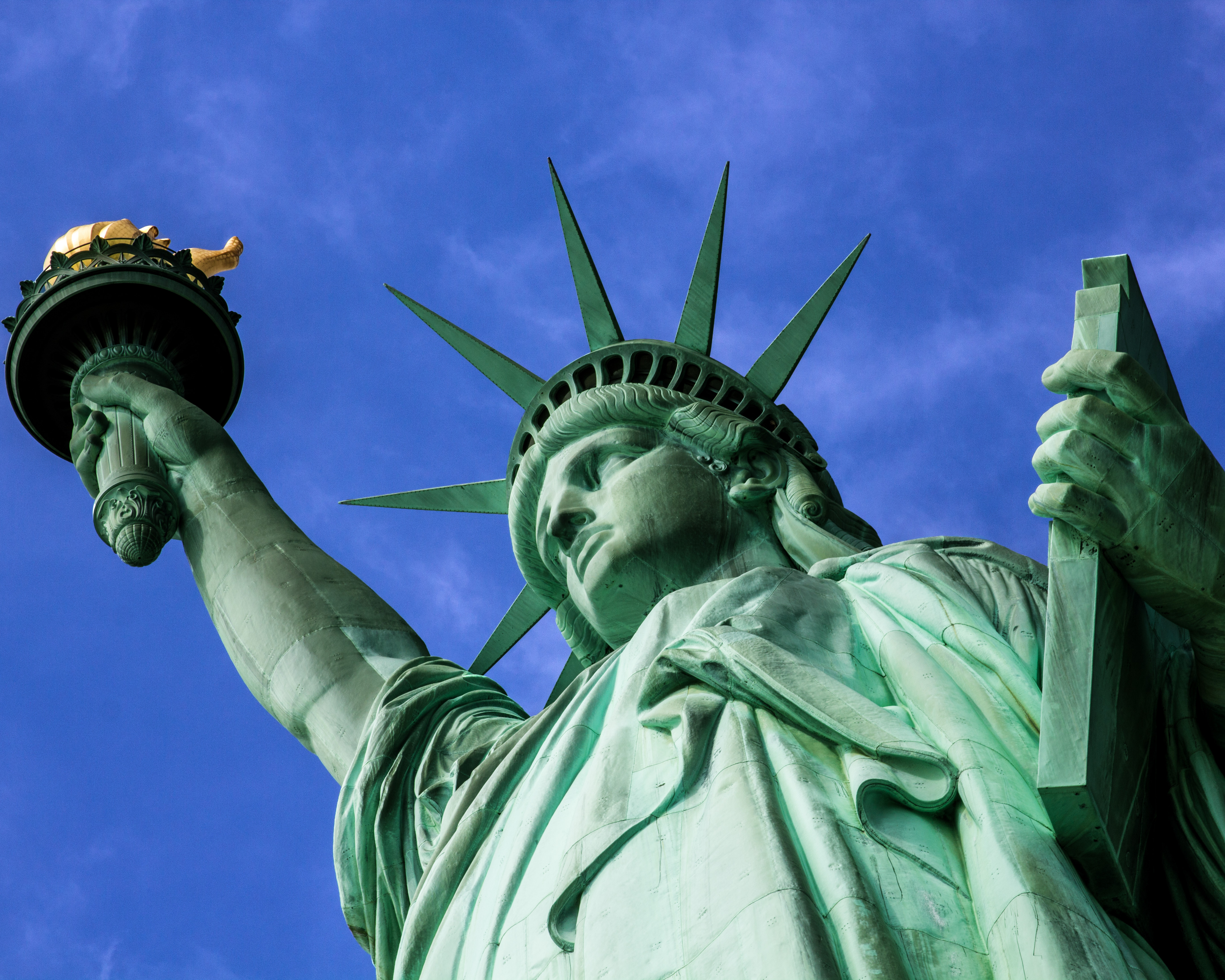
Statue of Liberty National Monument, New Jersey and New York

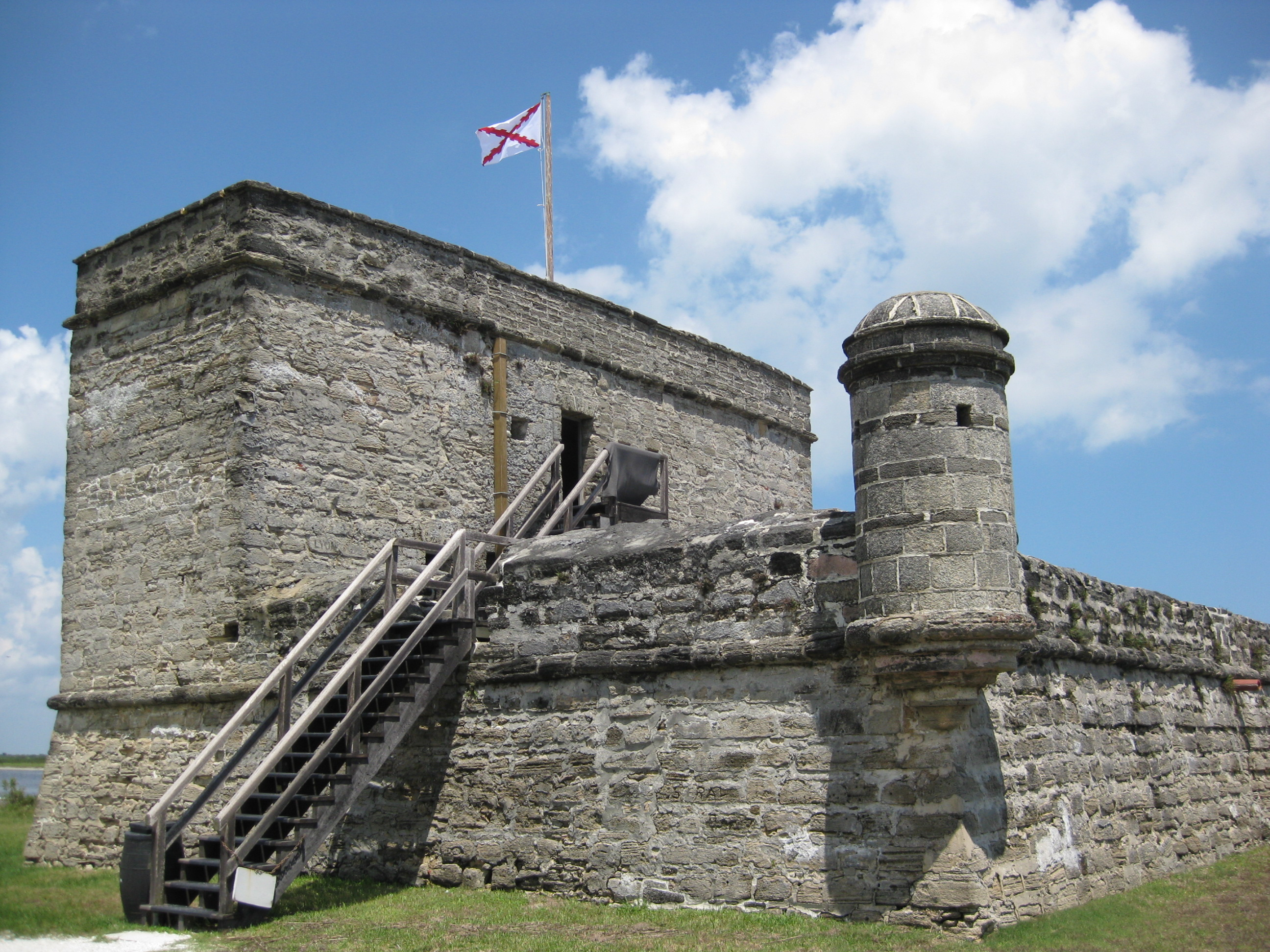
Fort Matanzas National Monument, Florida

In the United States, a national monument is a protected area created by proclamation of the president of the United States or by act of Congress. National monuments protect a wide variety of natural and historic resources, including sites of geologic, marine, archaeological, and cultural importance. The Antiquities Act of 1906 established the national monument designation and gave presidents the power to proclaim the creation of a national monument from any area owned or controlled by the federal government. In contrast, national parks in the U.S. must be created by Congressional legislation. Some national monuments were first created by presidential action and later designated as national parks by congressional approval.

The 138 national monuments are managed by several federal agencies: the National Park Service, United States Forest Service, United States Fish and Wildlife Service, the Bureau of Land Management, and the National Oceanic and Atmospheric Administration (in the case of marine national monuments). Historically, some national monuments were managed by the War Department.

President Theodore Roosevelt used the Antiquities Act to declare Devils Tower in Wyoming as the first U.S. national monument.

== History ==
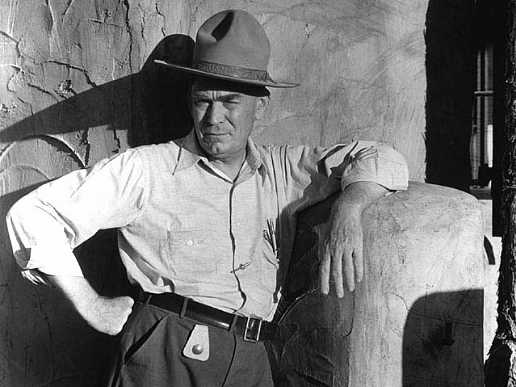
Supt. Frank "Boss" Pinkley – the southwestern national monuments, 1934

The Antiquities Act authorized permits for legitimate archaeological investigations and penalties for taking or destroying antiquities without permission. Additionally, it authorized the president to proclaim "historic landmarks, historic and prehistoric structures, and other objects of historic or scientific interest" on federal lands as national monuments, "the limits of which in all cases shall be confined to the smallest area compatible with the proper care and management of the objects to be protected."

Presidents have used the Antiquities Act's proclamation authority not only to create new national monuments but to enlarge existing ones. For example, Franklin D. Roosevelt significantly enlarged Dinosaur National Monument in 1938. Lyndon B. Johnson added Ellis Island to Statue of Liberty National Monument in 1965, and Jimmy Carter made major additions to Glacier Bay and Katmai National Monuments in 1978.

=== Early 20th century origin ===
The Antiquities Act of 1906 resulted from concerns about protecting mostly prehistoric Native American ruins and artifacts (collectively termed "antiquities") on federal lands in the American West. It permitted the president to "declare by public proclamation historic landmarks, historic and prehistoric structures, and other objects of historic or scientific interest that are situated upon the lands owned or controlled by the Government of the United States to be national monuments".

The reference in the act to "objects of ... scientific interest" enabled President Theodore Roosevelt to make a natural geological feature, Devils Tower in Wyoming, the first national monument three months later. Among the next three monuments he proclaimed in 1906 was Petrified Forest in Arizona, another natural feature. In 1908, Roosevelt used the act to proclaim more than 800,000 acres (3,200 km^{2}) of the Grand Canyon as a national monument.

In response to Roosevelt's declaration of the Grand Canyon monument, a putative mining claimant sued in federal court, claiming that Roosevelt had overstepped the Antiquities Act authority by protecting an entire canyon. In 1920, the United States Supreme Court ruled unanimously that the Grand Canyon was indeed "an object of historic or scientific interest" and could be protected by proclamation, setting a precedent for the use of the Antiquities Act to preserve large areas. Federal courts have since rejected every challenge to the president's use of Antiquities Act preservation authority, ruling that the law gives the president exclusive discretion over the determination of the size and nature of the objects protected.

=== Mid-20th century ===
In 1918, President Woodrow Wilson proclaimed Katmai National Monument in Alaska, comprising more than 1,000,000 acres (4,000 km^{2}). Katmai was later enlarged to nearly 2,800,000 acres (11,000 km^{2}) by subsequent Antiquities Act proclamations and for many years was the largest national park system unit.

Petrified Forest, Grand Canyon, and Great Sand Dunes, among several other national parks, were also originally proclaimed as national monuments and later designated national parks by Congress.

Substantial opposition did not materialize until 1943, when President Franklin D. Roosevelt proclaimed Jackson Hole National Monument in Wyoming. He did this to accept a donation of lands acquired by John D. Rockefeller Jr., for addition to Grand Teton National Park after Congress had declined to authorize this park expansion. Roosevelt's proclamation unleashed a storm of criticism about use of the Antiquities Act to circumvent Congress. A bill abolishing Jackson Hole National Monument passed Congress but was vetoed by Roosevelt, and Congressional and court challenges to the proclamation authority were mounted. In 1950, Congress finally incorporated most of the monument into Grand Teton National Park, but the act doing so barred further use of the proclamation authority in Wyoming except for areas of 5,000 acres or less.

=== Late 20th century and early 21st century ===
The most substantial use of the proclamation authority came in 1978, when President Jimmy Carter proclaimed 17 new national monuments in Alaska after Congress had adjourned without passing a major Alaska lands bill. Congress passed a revised version of the bill in 1980 incorporating most of these national monuments into national parks and preserves, but the act also curtailed further use of the proclamation authority in Alaska.

Carter's 1978 proclamations included Misty Fjords and Admiralty Island National Monuments in the U.S. Forest Service and Becharof and Yukon Flats National Monuments in the Fish and Wildlife Service, the first to be created outside of the National Park Service. The latter two became national wildlife refuges in 1980.

The proclamation authority was not used again anywhere until 1996, when President Bill Clinton proclaimed the Grand Staircase–Escalante National Monument in Utah, after many years of unsuccessful advocacy by conservationists to protect parts of the area. This was the first national monument managed by the Bureau of Land Management. This action was unpopular in Utah, and bills were introduced to further restrict the president's authority, none of which have been enacted. Most of the 16 national monuments created by President Clinton are managed not by the National Park Service, but by the Bureau of Land Management as part of the National Landscape Conservation System.

President George W. Bush created four marine national monuments in the Pacific Ocean, the largest in the system: Papahānaumokuākea, Pacific Islands Heritage, Mariana Trench, and the Rose Atoll Marine National Monuments. They are managed by the Fish and Wildlife Service, with the National Oceanic and Atmospheric Administration overseeing the fisheries. President Barack Obama significantly expanded two of them and added a fifth in the Atlantic Ocean, the Northeast Canyons and Seamounts Marine National Monument. In the federal case Massachusetts Lobstermen’s Association v. Ross, the U.S. District Court for the District of Columbia held that "lands" within the Antiquities Act encompasses the submerged lands of the ocean floor, citing Supreme Court precent including Alaska v. United States.

On June 24, 2016, Obama designated the Stonewall Inn and surrounding areas in Greenwich Village, New York as the Stonewall National Monument, the first national monument commemorating the movement for LGBT rights in the United States. Obama's establishments included several others recognizing civil rights history, including the César E. Chávez, Belmont–Paul Women's Equality, Freedom Riders, and Birmingham Civil Rights National Monuments.

In December 2017, President Donald Trump substantially reduced the sizes of Bears Ears and Grand Staircase–Escalante National Monuments, removing protections on about 2.8 million acres of land where mining could resume. Three lawsuits challenged the legality of this action in federal court, and in October 2021, President Joe Biden reversed the changes. The restoration of the monuments has been challenged in court in an attempt to attack the Antiquities Act.

President Biden's proclamations establishing and expanding monuments often incorporated consultation with Native American tribes for management and planning.

In 2025, Trump's interior secretary Doug Burgum ordered a review of all withdrawn public lands including national monuments for their exploitation for drilling and mining.

== See also ==
- Antiquities Act of 1906
- List of national forests of the United States
- List of areas in the United States National Park System (includes list of NPS-managed national monuments)
- List of wilderness areas of the United States
- Protected areas of the United States
