= Bear Seamount =

Underwater volcano in the Atlantic Ocean

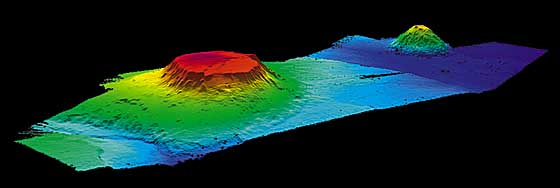
- 3-D depiction of Bear Seamount, with Physalia Seamount in the background.

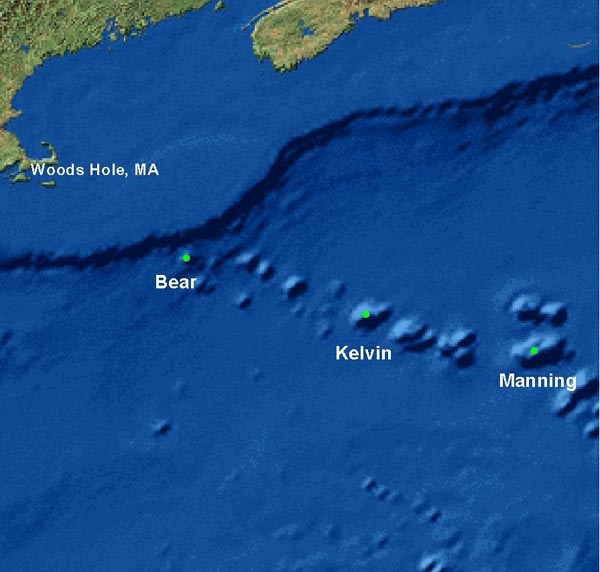
- Summit depth: 1,100 m (3,600 ft)
- Height: 2,000 m (6,600 ft)

Location
- Location: North Atlantic Ocean, about 200 miles (320 km) from Woods Hole, Massachusetts
- Coordinates: 39°55′N 67°24′W

Geology
- Type: Guyot
- Volcanic arc/chain: New England Seamounts
- Age of rock: 100–103 million years

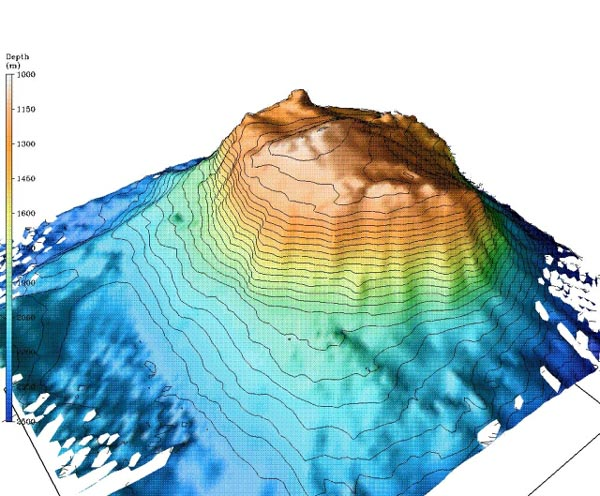
Bathymetric image of Bear Seamount

The Bear Seamount is a guyot or flat-topped underwater volcano in the Atlantic Ocean. It is the oldest of the New England Seamounts, which was active more than 100 million years ago. It was formed when the North American Plate moved over the New England hotspot. It is located inside the Northeast Canyons and Seamounts Marine National Monument, which was proclaimed by President of the United States Barack Obama to protect the seamount's biodiversity.

== Formation ==
The Bear Seamount is the first guyot in a chain of about 30 extinct volcanoes extending in a straight line south-eastwards from the edge of the continental shelf near Woods Hole, Massachusetts to north-east of Bermuda. These seamounts resulted from the movement of a mantle plume hotspot. This hotspot is now under the Great Meteor Seamount. The chain rises about 4,000 metres (13,000 ft) above the surrounding Sohm Abyssal Plain. Over time they have been eroded and have developed flat table-like summits surrounded by slopes with an inclination of about 20°. The currents in the vicinity of the Bear Seamount include the warm water Gulf Stream flowing towards the north east, the deep boundary current flowing along the continental shelf towards the south west, and the deep, icy cold Arctic bottom water that flows past the lower flanks of the chain.

Bear Seamount rises approximately 2,000 to 3,000 metres (6,600 to 9,800 ft) above the surrounding seabed and the roughly flat summit is about 1,100 metres (3,600 ft) below the surface of the sea. The top is covered by a deep layer of sediment through which basaltic rocks and erratic boulders protrude. Much of this material has fallen from above, probably from icebergs that drifted southwards during the Pleistocene.

== Biodiversity ==
Because little was known about the biodiversity of the New England Seamount Chain, an expedition was mounted in 2000. The NOAA National Marine Fisheries Service deep water research vessel R/V Delaware II made 20 exploratory trawls in the vicinity of Bear Seamount and around 274 species were collected. These included 115 species of fish, some of which were rare or had not been recorded in the western North Atlantic before. The roundnose grenadier (Coryphaenoides rupestris) and the onion-eye grenadier (Macrourus berglax) were the only fish species of potential commercial importance – they were caught in mid-water at depths of between 1,100 and 1,800 metres (3,600 and 5,900 ft) and were up to a metre in length. A common but much smaller fish was Aldrovandia phalacra.

Twenty-six species of cephalopods were collected including squid such as Mastigoteuthis agassizii and Mastigoteuthis magna. Other invertebrates caught by trawls dragged along the seamount surface included 46 species of crustacean such as the prawns Sergestes spp. and Acanthephyra spp., and the shrimp Pasiphaea spp. Also present was the bank-forming deepwater coral Lophelia pertusa, which supported a community of worms, hydroids and other corals. Brittle stars, especially Ophiomusium lymani, were numerous as were the sea urchin Echinus affinis, the sea star Neomorphaster forcipatus, mysids and various scyphozoans.
