= Milford Wayne Donaldson =

Preservation architect

Milford Wayne Donaldson, Jr.
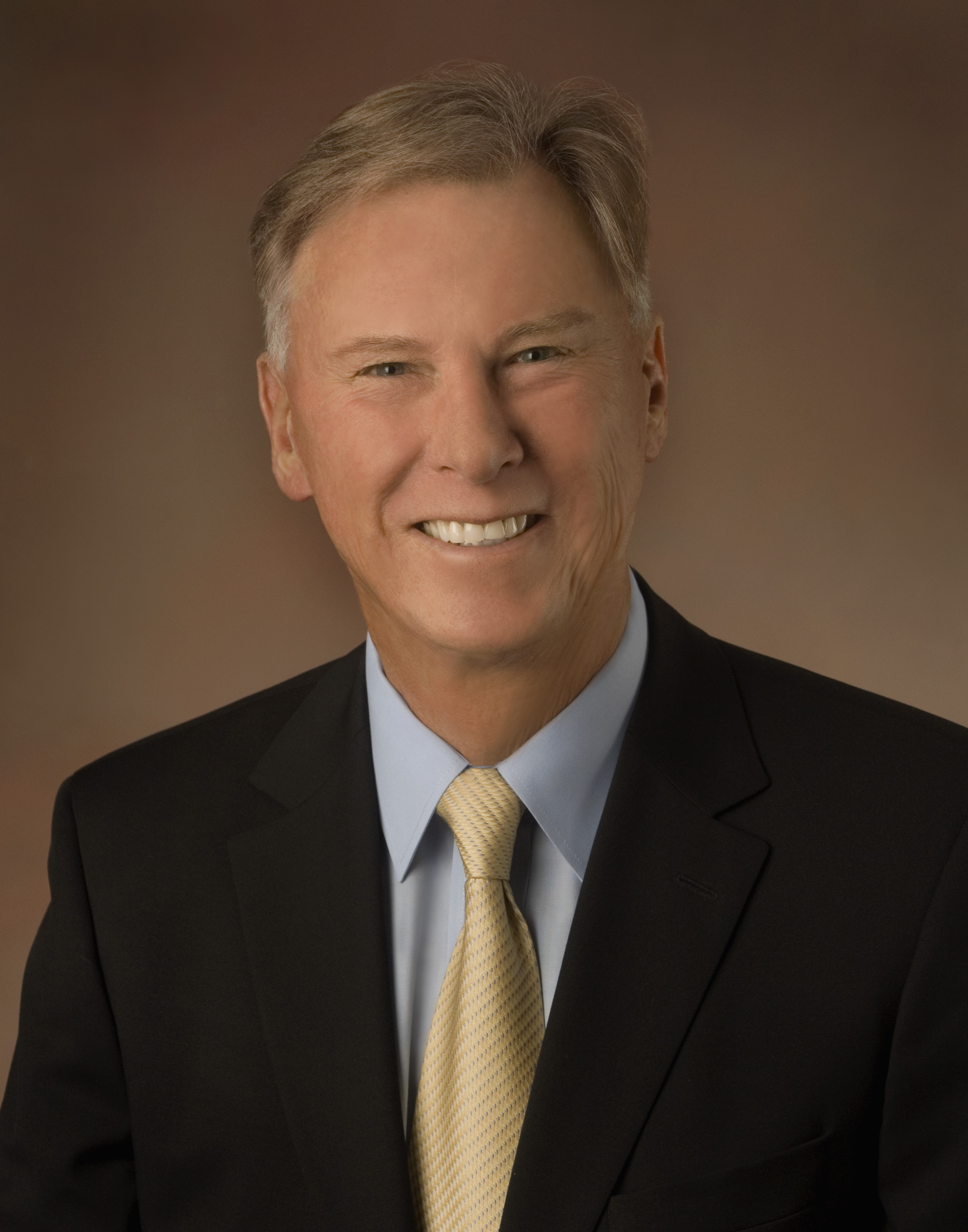

Chairman of the Advisory Council on Historic Preservation
- In office June 1, 2010 – July 22, 2019
- President: Barack Obama; Donald Trump
- Preceded by: John L. Nau III
- Succeeded by: Aimee K. Jordani

California State Historic Preservation Officer
- In office 2004–2012
- Governor: Arnold Schwarzenegger; Jerry Brown
- Preceded by: Knox Mellon
- Succeeded by: Carol Nawi-Roland

Personal details
- Born: Milford Wayne Donaldson; August 13, 1943 (age 83) Marine Corps Base Camp Lejeune, NC
- Education: California Polytechnic; State University, San Luis Obispo; University of Strathclyde; Glasgow, Scotland; University of San Diego
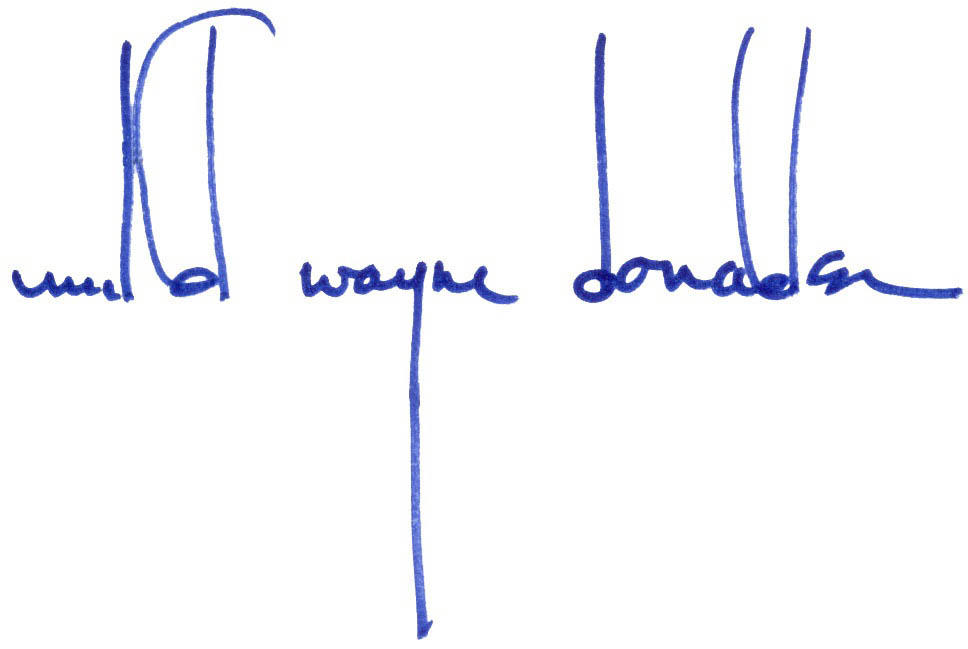
- Signature

Milford Wayne Donaldson (born August 13, 1943) is a preservation architect. He served as the Chairman of the Advisory Council on Historic Preservation (ACHP). Donaldson was originally appointed to the position in 2010, and President Barack Obama reappointed him in August 2013 for another four-year term. He left the role on July 22, 2019. Formerly the State Historic Preservation Officer of California, Donaldson has been practicing preservation architecture as a profession for more than 40 years.

== Early life and family ==
Donaldson was born on August 13, 1943, at Marine Corps Base Camp Lejeune to Milford "Don" Donaldson, a U.S. Navy corpsman and Jean Donaldson, a Navy nurse. Immediately after his birth Donaldson's parents were ordered to Marine Corps Base Camp Pendleton. The Donaldsons lived in a Quonset hut on base for three years before moving to Oceanside, California, in San Diego County, where Wayne grew up with his younger brother, Robert "Bob" Calvin Donaldson. During his early life Donaldson, a Boy Scout in Troop 739, San Diego-Imperial Council, Oceanside, eventually to become an Eagle Scout. By the middle of the 20th century, Milford Wayne Donaldson knew he would be an architect.

== Education ==
After high school, Donaldson earned his Bachelor of Architecture from California Polytechnic State University, San Luis Obispo, California, in 1967; a Master of Science in Architecture from the University of Strathclyde, Glasgow, Scotland, and a Master of Arts in Public History and Teaching from the University of San Diego. From 1966 to 1968, he attended undergraduate studies at Uppsala University in Sweden. In 2007, Donaldson received an honorary Master of Architecture from NewSchool of Architecture and Design in San Diego, which in 1980, he founded with Dick Welsh.

== Professional career ==
Donaldson's architectural knowledge unites historic building methods and archaic materials with state-of-the-art twenty-first century construction technologies. His architectural specialty is adobe, sod, stone, and earthen structures.

Licensed to practice architecture in California, Nevada and Arizona, Donaldson began his professional career as an associate for the San Diego architectural firm of Robert Mosher and Roy Drew, "Architects Mosher Drew," from 1972 to 1978. He and his former wife and partner Nancy founded their own firm, "Architect Milford Wayne Donaldson, FAIA" (Fellow of the American Institute of Architects) in 1978, specializing in historic preservation and renovation and adaptive reuse of existing structures. In 2004, before his appointment as CA SHPO, Donaldson renamed and sold his firm Heritage Architecture & Planning which is still located in San Diego. In 2007, Donaldson began and incorporated a new architectural firm, "Architect Milford Wayne Donaldson, FAIA, Inc., A Professional Corporation," which is still an active.

In 1991, the California Council of the American Institute of Architects (CCAIA) acknowledged Donaldson for his statewide leadership in historic preservation and in the interpretation of the State Historical Building Code which allowed the rehabilitation of historic buildings. In 1992, Donaldson was inducted into the AIA College of Fellows. Later, following the 1992 Cape Mendocino earthquakes and 1994 Northridge earthquake, Donaldson lent his expertise to save historic buildings from unwarranted demolition. His efforts continue today as a "Trainer in Emergency Response" for the California Emergency Management Agency (CalEMA) Service Worker Volunteer Program. Donaldson has also instructed classes in architecture, first at California Polytechnic State University from 1969 to 1970, and later at Southwestern Community College from 1976 to 1984. Donaldson continues to lecture on preservation architecture at various schools, colleges, and universities.

== California Office of Historic Preservation ==
Donaldson served as California's State Historic Preservation Officer from April 2004 until his retirement in September 2012. The first architect to serve as a CA SHPO, Donaldson was appointed by Governor Arnold Schwarzenegger in April 2004. The SHPO serves as chief administrative officer of the California Office of Historic Preservation (OHP) in Sacramento and also as Executive Secretary of the State Historical Resources Commission (SHRC). Meeting four times a year, the SHRC is a nine-member state review board, appointed by the governor, responsible for identifying, registering, and preserving California's cultural heritage.
