= Tribal Historic Preservation Officer =

A Tribal Historic Preservation Officer or THPO is an officer in U.S. federally recognized Native American tribes "to direct a program approved by the National Park Service and the THPO must have assumed some or all of the functions of State Historic Preservation Officers on Tribal lands." THPOs can be appointed by Indian tribes that are recognized by the federal government to direct and lead programs that were supported by the National Park Service.

Each THPO prepares a Tribal Historic Preservation Plan, which is used to "advise Federal agencies on the management of Tribal historic properties..."

The National Historic Preservation Act, Section 101(d)(2), created the NPS program for THPOs. To create a position, the tribe submits a historic preservation plan to the NPS. This plan is supposed to describe how the "proposed Tribal Historic Preservation Officer functions will be carried out." They are elected to perform the same duties as a State Historic Preservation Office, but not forced or required to. Tribes elect them, and while they can not participate, most tribes do because they assist in preserving the historic properties and land."They are also available to advise federal, state and local agencies on the management of Tribal historic properties and instruct municipalities on Section 106 reviews to represent tribal interests."

The THPOs are worried about protecting the importance of their "traditional cultural properties, places that are eligible for inclusion on the National Register of Historic Places because of their association with cultural practices and beliefs." The most important beliefs include the history of their culture and community, and keeping up with their traditions.

THPOs works with museums to implement the Native American Graves Protection and Repatriation Act (NAGPRA).

== See also ==
- Historic preservation
- State Historic Preservation Officer (SHPO)
- Tribal sovereignty in the United States
