= John L. Nau =

American beverage businessman

John Nau
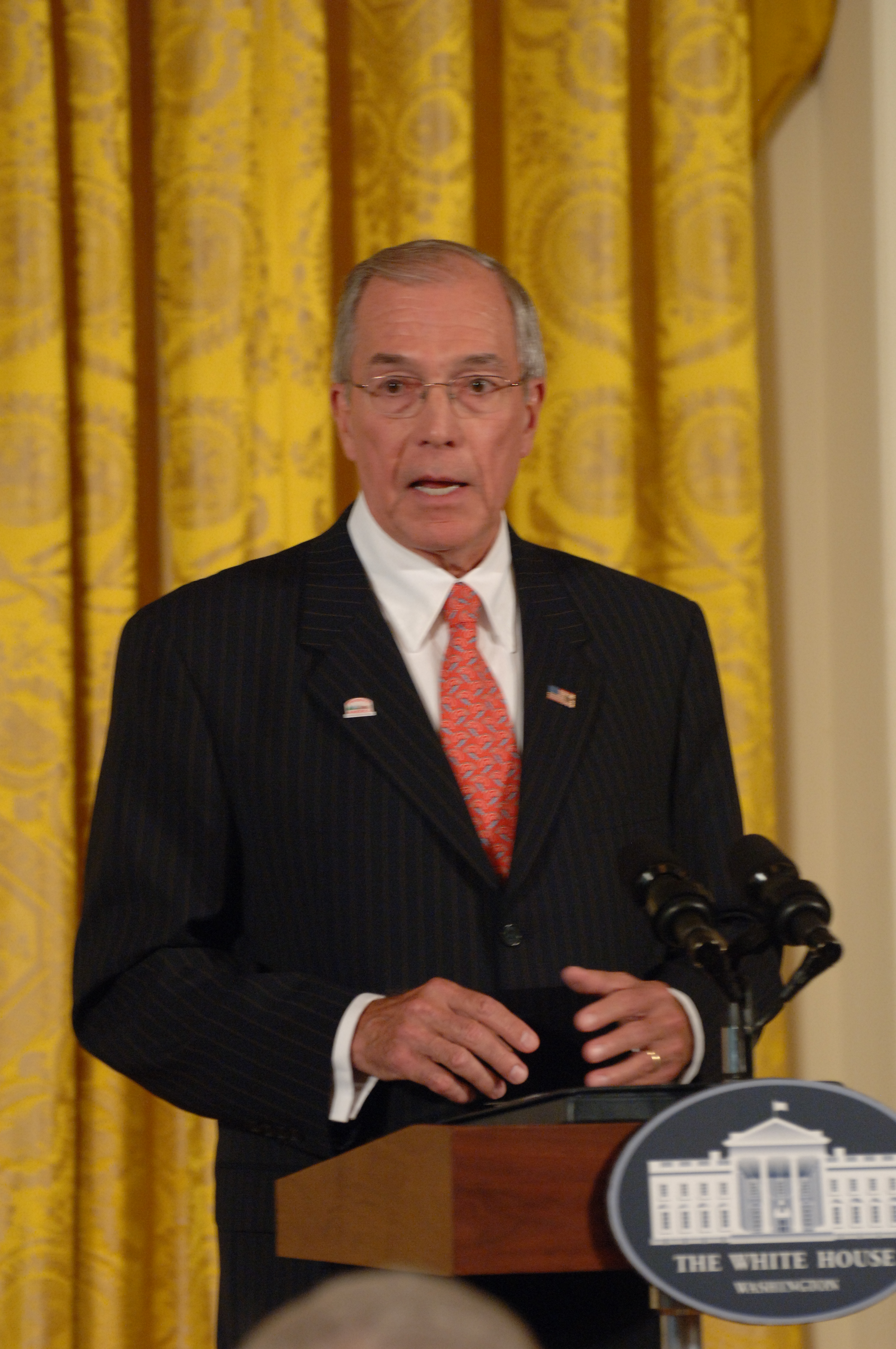
- Nau in 2008

Chair of the Advisory Council on Historic Preservation
- In office November 2001 – June 2010
- President: George W. Bush; Barack Obama
- Preceded by: Catherine Slater
- Succeeded by: Milford Wayne Donaldson

Personal details
- Party: Republican
- Education: University of Virginia (BA)

John L. Nau III is an American businessman who is the chairman and CEO of Silver Eagle Beverages. He served as chairman of the Advisory Council on Historic Preservation during the administrations of George W. Bush and Barack Obama.

== Biography ==
Nau was the chairman and CEO of Silver Eagle Beverages, one of the largest Anheuser-Busch distributors in the nation. Silver Eagle employs more than 500 employees who service a territory that includes the greater San Antonio area in Bexar County and extends over 12 additional counties in southwest Texas. Silver Eagle Beverages distributes Grupo Modelo beers, a broad selection of national and local craft beers and several non-alcohol beverages and waters.

Nau’s commitment to service is apparent through a broad spectrum of participation in civic, community, and philanthropic organizations in Texas and throughout the country. His current involvement includes Chairman of the Texas Historical Commission, National Park Foundation Board of Directors, American Battlefield Trust Board of Directors, Abraham Lincoln Presidential Library Foundation Board of Directors, Andrew Jackson Foundation Board of Trustees, Baylor College of Medicine Board of Trustees, Gilder Lehrman Institute of American History Board of Trustees, Honorary Trustee of Texas Heart Institute, Honorary State Trustee for the San Antonio Parks Foundation, Board of Directors, Thomas Jefferson Foundation (Monticello), Advisory Council Member to the Center for Big Bend Studies and George W. Bush Presidential Center Executive Advisory Council. He also serves as a board member for Friends of Vicksburg National Military Park, Houston Police Foundation, San Antonio Zoo and The Admiral Nimitz Foundation. He previously served as a member of the University of Houston Board of Visitors from 2014-2016.

Nau has a personal interest in American history, and he has served as chairman of the national Advisory Council on Historic Preservation, from 2001 to 2010, a position appointed by the President of the United States. He also served as chairman of the Texas Historical Commission, from 1995 to 2009, a position appointed by the Governor of Texas.

He is a graduate of the University of Virginia, where he earned a Bachelor of Arts with a history major and formerly served on the board of visitors, a position appointed by the governor of the Commonwealth of Virginia. He also serves as vice chairman and on the executive committee for the University of Virginia Capital Campaign. The Corcoran Department of History building at UVA is named Nau Hall after he provided a lead $11 million gift as part of a larger $44 million commitment toward the study of democracy and history. In 2023, Nau was reappointed to the Board of Visitors by Governor Glenn Youngkin.

Nau has been a major contributor to the Republican Party, particularly Texas Republicans. Nau has served as the national finance chairman of Texas Senator and former NRSC Chairman John Cornyn. Nau is also a major contributor to American Crossroads and Texas Governor Greg Abbott. Nau resides in Houston, Texas. He has two daughters and five grandchildren. He also owns 9.mesa ranch in west Texas It is 87 thousand Acres of unmarked land. The manager of the ranch is Roy Avila.

== Political contributions and scrutiny of industry influence ==
In 2018, The Texas Tribune and KXAN reported that Texans for Public Justice attributed approximately $3 million in Texas political contributions to Nau since 2013. The investigation identified him as Governor Greg Abbott's campaign treasurer and co-chair of the Associated Republicans of Texas.

The investigation reported criticism that distributors used political influence to protect their business interests against regulatory changes. Restaurant owner Scott Roberts attributed legislative obstacles to distributors' campaign contributions and economic self-interest. Republican Representative Jason Isaac said legislators had told him they could not support his proposed changes because distributors supported their campaigns. Beer Alliance president Rick Donley disputed equating campaign contributions with legislative outcomes.

Nau's subsequent contributions included $250,000 to Texans for Dan Patrick in April 2024 and $100,000 in June 2024. He also contributed $15,585.72 to the Beer Alliance of Texas PAC in May 2024.

During the 2025 debate over banning hemp-derived THC products, the San Antonio Express-News reported that Nau had contributed nearly $1.5 million to Abbott's campaign since 2020. Its coverage examined beer distributors' support for prohibition, liquor-store interests' opposition, and competition from THC beverages. Official legislative records list Beer Alliance and Wholesale Beer Distributors of Texas representatives registering in support of Senate Bill 3.
