= Title 54 of the United States Code =

U.S. federal statutes on national parks

Title 54 of the United States Code (54 U.S.C.), entitled National Park Service and Related Programs, is the compilation of the general laws regarding the National Park Service. It is the newest title in the United States Code, added on December 19, 2014, when U.S. president Barack Obama signed H.R. 1068 into law. It has three subtitles:

- Subtitle I: National Park System
- Subtitle II: Outdoor Recreation Programs
- Subtitle III: National Preservation Programs

== History ==
Title 54 was prepared by the Office of the Law Revision Counsel of the United States House of Representatives, in accordance with 2 U.S.C. § 285b. It consists of laws previously codified in Title 16 (Conservation).

H.R. 1068 was introduced on March 12, 2013, and referred to the Committee on the Judiciary of the House of Representatives. The bill was reported by the Committee on April 19, 2013, and passed by the House of Representatives on April 23, 2013. No further action was taken for more than a year, until the bill passed in the Senate by unanimous consent on December 15, 2014, and was signed into law by President Obama on December 19.

== Outline of title 54 ==
Title 54

=== Subtitle I — National Park System ===
Subtitle I

- Division A — Establishment and general administration
  - Chapter 1001 — General provisions
  - Chapter 1003 — Establishment, directors, and other employees
  - Chapter 1005 — Areas of National Park System
  - Chapter 1007 — Resource management
  - Chapter 1008 — Education and interpretation
  - Chapter 1009 — Administration
  - Chapter 1011 — Donations
  - Chapter 1013 — Employees
  - Chapter 1015 — Transportation
  - Chapter 1017 — Financial agreements
  - Chapter 1019 — Concessions and commercial use authorizations
  - Chapter 1021 — Privileges and leases
  - Chapter 1023 — Programs and organizations
  - Chapter 1025 — Museums
  - Chapter 1027 — Law enforcement and emergency assistance
  - Chapter 1029 — Land transfers
  - Chapter 1031 — Appropriations and accounting
  - Chapter 1033 — National military parks
  - Chapter 1035 — National Park Centennial Challenge Fund
  - Chapters 1035 through 1047 — Reserved
  - Chapter 1049 — Miscellaneous
- Division B — System units and related areas — Reserved
- Division C — National heritage areas
  - Chapter 1201 — National Heritage Area system

=== Subtitle II — Outdoor Recreation Programs ===
Subtitle II

- Chapter 2001 — Coordination of programs
- Chapter 2003 — Land and Water Conservation Fund
- Chapter 2004 — National parks and public land legacy restoration fund
- Chapter 2005 — Urban park and recreation recovery program

=== Subtitle III — National Preservation Programs ===
Subtitle III

- Division A — Historic preservation
  - Subdivision 1 — General provisions
    - Chapter 3001 — Policy
    - Chapter 3003 — Definitions
  - Subdivision 2 — Historic preservation program
    - Chapter 3021 — National Register of Historic Places
    - Chapter 3023 — State historic preservation programs
    - Chapter 3025 — Certification of local governments
    - Chapter 3027 — Historic preservation programs and authorities for Indian tribes and native Hawaiian organizations
    - Chapter 3029 — Grants
    - Chapter 3031 — Historic preservation fund
    - Chapters 3033 through 3037 — Reserved
    - Chapter 3039 — Miscellaneous
  - Subdivision 3 — Advisory Council on Historic Preservation
    - Chapter 3041 — Advisory Council on Historic Preservation
  - Subdivision 4 — Other organizations and programs
    - Chapter 3051 — Historic light station preservation
    - Chapter 3053 — National Center for Preservation Technology and Training
    - Chapter 3055 — National Building Museum
  - Subdivision 5 — Federal agency historic preservation responsibilities
    - Chapter 3061 — Program responsibilities and authorities
  - Subdivision 6 — Miscellaneous
    - Chapter 3071 — Miscellaneous
- Division B — Organizations and programs
  - Subdivision 1 — Administered by National Park Service
    - Chapter 3081 — American Battlefield Protection Program
    - Chapter 3083 — National Underground Railroad Network to Freedom
    - Chapter 3084 — African American civil rights network
    - Chapter 3085 — National women's rights history project
    - Chapter 3086 — United States African-American burial grounds preservation program
    - Chapter 3087 — National maritime heritage
    - Chapter 3089 — Save America's Treasures program
    - Chapter 3091 — Commemoration of former presidents
  - Subdivision 2 — Administered jointly with National Park Service
    - Chapter 3111 — Preserve America program
  - Subdivision 3 — Administered by other than National Park Service
    - Chapter 3121 — National Trust for Historic Preservation in the United States
    - Chapter 3123 — Commission for the Preservation of America's Heritage Abroad
    - Chapter 3125 — Preservation of historical and archaeological data
- Division C — American antiquities
  - Chapter 3201 — Policy and administrative provisions
  - Chapter 3203 — Monuments, ruins, sites, and objects of antiquity
