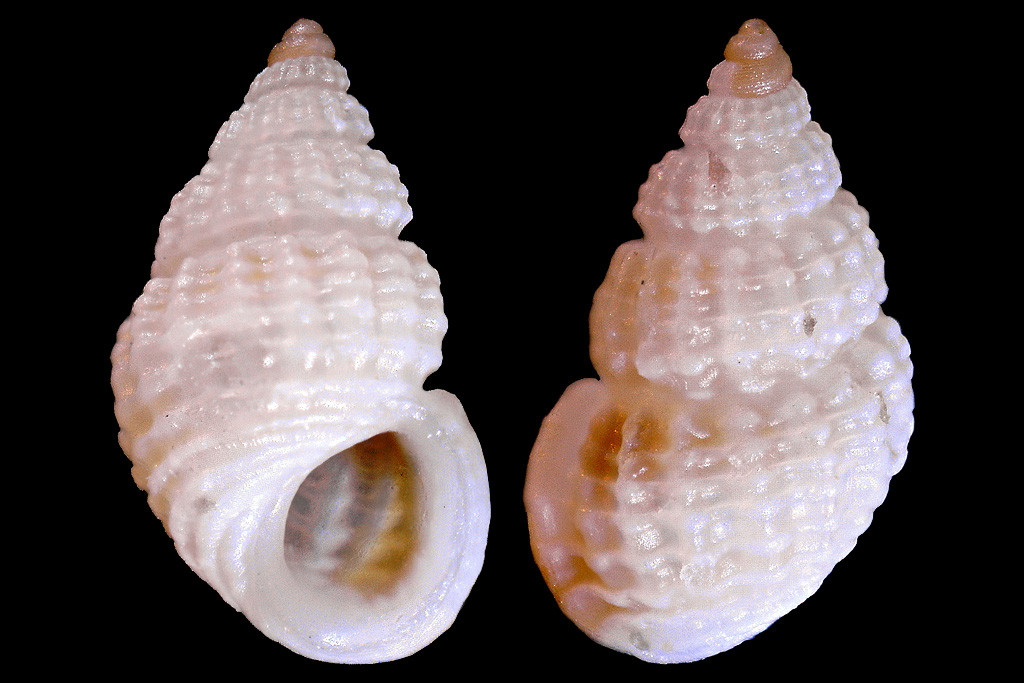
- Shell of Alvania cimicoides

Scientific classification
- Kingdom: Animalia
- Phylum: Mollusca
- Class: Gastropoda
- Subclass: Caenogastropoda
- Order: Littorinimorpha
- Superfamily: Rissooidea
- Family: Rissoidae
- Genus: Alvania
- Species: A. cimicoides

Binomial name
- Alvania cimicoides (Forbes, 1844)

Synonyms
- Alvania (Acinopsis) sculpta (R. A. Philippi, 1844) junior subjective synonym; Alvania (Turbona) sculpta Philippi, 1844; Rissoa cimicoides Forbes, 1844 (original combination); Rissoa cimicoides var. minima Jeffreys, 1867; Rissoa intermedia Aradas, 1847; Rissoa sculpta R. A. Philippi, 1844 junior subjective synonym; Turbona hispidula fuscoapicalis F. Nordsieck, 1974 ·

= Alvania cimicoides =

Species of gastropod

Alvania cimicoides is a species of minute sea snail, a marine gastropod mollusc or micromollusk in the family Rissoidae.

== Description ==
The length of the shell varies between 3.4 mm and 5 mm.

The solid shell is opaque, yellowish or fulvous brown. It is sometimes bifasciate, with rather broad longitudinal riblets, vanishing below, crossed by spiral undulating lirae, forming intersectional nodules. The shell contains 7-8 whorls, somewhat flattened in the middle, the last dilated. The suture is channeled. The outer lip is varicose.

== Distribution ==
This species occurs in the Arctic Ocean off Greenland, in the Atlantic Ocean from Norway to the Azores. It is also circumlittoral in the Mediterranean Sea (Spain, Corsica, Greece, Turkey).

Fossils have been in Pliocene strata in Cotentin, France.
