= Antiquities Act =

1906 U.S. law allowing the president to create national monuments from federal lands

- Long title: An act for the preservation of American antiquities.
- Enacted by: the 59th United States Congress
- Effective: June 8, 1906; 120 years ago

Citations
- Public law: Pub. L. 59–209
- Statutes at Large: 34 Stat. 225

Codification
- U.S.C. sections created: 54 U.S.C. ch. 3203 §§ 320301 to 320303

Legislative history
- Introduced in the House as H.R. 11016 by John F. Lacey (R–IA) on January 9, 1906; Committee consideration by Public Lands; Passed the House on June 5, 1906; Passed the Senate on June 7, 1906 with amendment; House agreed to Senate amendment on June 8, 1906 (); Signed into law by President Theodore Roosevelt on June 8, 1906

United States Supreme Court cases
- Cameron v. United States, 252 U.S. 450 (1920); Cappaert v. United States, 426 U.S. 128 (1976); United States v. California, 436 U.S. 32 (1978); Alaska v. United States, 545 U.S. 75 (2005)

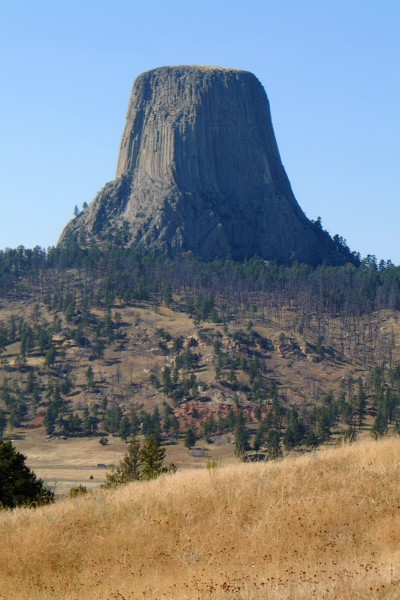
Devils Tower, the first national monument

The Antiquities Act of 1906 (Pub. L. 59–209, 34 Stat. 225, 54 U.S.C. §§ 320301–320303) is an act that was passed by the United States Congress and signed into law by Theodore Roosevelt on June 8, 1906. This law gives the president of the United States the authority to, by presidential proclamation, create national monuments from federal lands to protect significant natural, historic, or scientific features. The Act has been used more than a hundred times since its enactment to create a wide variety of protected areas.

== History ==
The Antiquities Act was signed into law by President Theodore Roosevelt during his second term in office. The act resulted from concerns about protecting mostly prehistoric Native American ruins and artifacts—collectively termed "antiquities"—on federal lands in the West, such as at Chaco Canyon, New Mexico. Removal of artifacts from these lands by private collectors, "pot hunters," had become a serious problem by the end of the 19th century. In 1902, Iowa congressman John F. Lacey, who chaired the House Committee on the Public Lands, traveled to the Southwest with the rising anthropologist Edgar Lee Hewett, to see for himself the extent of the pot hunters' impact. His findings, supported by an exhaustive report by Hewett to Congress detailing the archaeological resources of the region, provided the necessary impetus for the passage of the legislation.

The Act failed to deter purposeful, criminal looting at these protected sites and was deemed too vague, eventually resulting in passage of the Archaeological Resources Protection Act of 1979. The Antiquities Act has been praised by several groups for its ability to protect important sites, including The Wilderness Society, the National Parks Conservation Association, The Pew Charitable Trusts, and the National Trust for Historic Preservation. Since the Antiquities Act became law, all but three presidents, Richard Nixon, Ronald Reagan, and George H. W. Bush, have chosen to enlarge or dedicate new national monuments. President Obama established more monuments than any president, with 29 in total. The previous record was held by President Clinton with 19 monuments. President Carter dedicated the most acreage to national monuments, mostly in areas in Alaska. On April 26, 2017, President Donald Trump signed Executive Order 13792 directing a review of the law and its uses.

== Uses ==
The Act was intended to allow the president to set aside certain valuable public natural areas as park and conservation land. The 1906 act stated that it was intended for: "... the protection of objects of historic and scientific interest." These areas are given the title of "national monuments." It also allows the president to reserve or accept private lands for that purpose. The aim is to protect all historic and prehistoric sites on United States federal lands and to prohibit excavation or destruction of these antiquities. With this act, this can be done much more quickly than going through the Congressional process of creating a national park. The Act states that areas of the monuments are to be confined to the smallest area compatible with the proper care and management of the objects to be protected.

Protection of sites can include restrictions on mining, logging, grazing, commercial fishing, and hunting; known as land withdrawals, these are typically described in the presidential proclamation establishing the monument. Some areas designated as national monuments have later been converted to or incorporated into national parks or national historical parks. 29 of the 64 national parks include areas originally designated as national monuments. The first use of the Act protected a large geographic feature: President Theodore Roosevelt proclaimed Devils Tower National Monument on September 24, 1906. President Roosevelt also used it to create the Grand Canyon National Monument (now Grand Canyon National Park) and sixteen other sites.

At 583,000 square miles (1,510,000 km^{2}), Papahānaumokuākea Marine National Monument is the largest protected area proclaimed. George W. Bush signed proclamation Proclamation 8031 to establish the monument in 2006, and President Barack Obama expanded its size in 2016. The smallest, Father Millet Cross National Monument (now part of a state park), was a mere 0.0074 acres (30 m^{2}). For any excavation, the Act requires that a permit (Antiquities Permit) be obtained from the Secretary of the department which has jurisdiction over those lands. Presidents have historically tended to create more monuments during their second terms or lame duck periods.

== Reduction of powers ==
Presidential powers under the Act have been reduced twice. The first time followed the controversial proclamation of Jackson Hole National Monument in 1943. The 1950 law that incorporated Jackson Hole into an enlarged Grand Teton National Park also amended the Antiquities Act, requiring Congressional consent for any future creation or enlargement of national monuments in Wyoming. The second time followed Jimmy Carter's use of the Act to create 17 national monuments in Alaska covering 56 million acres (230,000 km^{2}). The Alaska National Interest Lands Conservation Act rescinded Carter's withdrawals while establishing those areas as national parks or other site types and requires Congressional ratification of the use of the Antiquities Act in Alaska for withdrawals of greater than 5,000 acres (20 km^{2}).

The Trump administration conducted a review of 27 major designations to consider changes and Trump subsequently significantly reduced the size of Grand Staircase–Escalante National Monument and Bears Ears National Monument in Utah in 2017. Trump also lifted restrictions on commercial fishing at Northeast Canyons and Seamounts Marine National Monument. The legality of these actions was challenged in federal court, and President Biden restored the original areas and protections in 2021; that restoration was legally challenged. Although some presidents have chosen to ignore the tradition of preservation of notable environmental or historic areas, no president has entirely undone a predecessor's monument. The United States Supreme Court has repeatedly upheld presidential proclamations under the Antiquities Act, ruling each time that the Act gives the president wide discretion as to the nature of the object to be protected and the size of the area reserved. The first such case was a unanimous decision in 1920 that upheld the creation of Grand Canyon National Monument.

== See also ==
- List of national monuments of the United States
- National Park Service
