= Great Meteor Seamount =

Guyot in the Southern Azores Seamount Chain

- Great Meteor Seamount at the southern edge of the Atlantis-Meteor Seamount Complex
- Great Meteor Seamount at the southern edge of the Atlantis-Meteor Seamount Complex
- Summit depth: 270 m (890 ft)
- Height: 4,500 m (14,800 ft)
- Summit area: 50x28 km^{2} (1465 km^{2})

Location
- Location: North Atlantic Ocean, 1,000 km (620 mi) south of the Azores
- Coordinates: 29°57′10.6″N 28°35′31.3″W

Geology
- Type: Guyot
- Volcanic arc/chain: Seewarte Seamounts

History
- Discovery date: 1938
- Discovered by: Meteor

The Great Meteor Seamount, also called the Great Meteor Tablemount, is a guyot and the largest seamount in the North Atlantic with a volume of 24,000 km^{3} (5,800 mi^{3}). It is one of the Seewarte Seamounts, rooted on a large terrace located south of the Azores Plateau. The crust underlying Great Meteor has an age of 85 million years, deduced from the magnetic anomaly 34 (An34) at this location.

The shallow and flat summit of the Great Meteor Seamount, ranging between 150 and 300 m (490 and 980 ft) below sea level, suggests that it may have emerged sometime in the past 30 million years. It is covered by a 150 to 600 m (490 to 1,970 ft) thick layer of limestone, pyroclastic rocks and bioclastic sandstones. Dredged basalts from the top of the eastern and southeastern flanks of the seamount have been K–Ar dated 10.7 ± 0.5 and 16.3 ± 0.4 million years old, respectively. The oldest sample has been ^{40}Ar/^{39}Ar dated at 17 ± 0.3 million years old.

Two small seamounts exist just southwest of Great Meteor and are encircled by the −3800 m bathymetric line. These are the Closs Seamount, roughly oriented NNE-SSW, with its peak at 1,400 m (4,600 ft) depth and covering an area of approximately 390 km^{2} (150 mi^{2}), and the Little Meteor Seamount, located NNE of Closs, with over 960 km^{2} (370 mi^{2}) and a flat top 400 m (1,300 ft) below sea level.

The German research vessel Meteor discovered the tablemount in 1938. It was given the name Great Meteor Bank, a designation still used in the official GEBCO gazetteer.

== Formation ==
The New England hotspot formed the White Mountains 124 to 100 million years ago when the North American continent was directly overhead. As the continent drifted to the west, the hotspot gradually moved offshore. On a southeasterly course, the hotspot formed Bear Seamount, the oldest in the chain, about 100 to 103 million years ago. Over the course of millions of years, it continued creating the rest of the seamounts, eventually culminating in the Nashville Seamount about 83 million years ago. As the Atlantic Ocean continued to spread, the hotspot eventually traveled further east, forming the Great Meteor Seamount where it is found today. Radiometric dating of basalt from the Great Meteor Seamount has given ages of about 11 and 16 million years old, with the bulk of the seamount possibly having formed about 22 million years ago.

== Ecology ==
The unique ecological condition of the Great Meteor Seamount is shown by the many endemic copepod and nematode species.
