= Advisory Council on Historic Preservation =

American federal government agency

Agency overview
- Formed: 1966
- Jurisdiction: United States federal government
- Headquarters: 401 F Street NW, Suite 308 Washington, D.C. 20001
- Employees: 40 (2020)
- Annual budget: $7.378 million (2020)
- Agency executives: Vacant, Chairman; Travis Voyles, Vice Chairman; Reid Nelson, Acting Executive Director; Javier Marques, General Counsel
- Website: www.achp.gov

The Advisory Council on Historic Preservation (ACHP), an independent United States federal agency, is charged with the mission to promote the preservation of the nation's diverse historic resources. The ACHP advises the president and Congress on national historic preservation policy and also provides a public forum for stakeholders and the public to influence federal agency decisions regarding federal projects and programs that affect historic properties. The ACHP promotes the importance of historic preservation to foster an understanding of the nation's heritage and the contribution that historic preservation can make to contemporary communities, along with their economic and social well-being.

In 2025, Trump issued an executive order that implemented leadership changes at the ACHP to expedite energy projects under the auspices of a "National Energy Emergency", which permitted fossil development on federal lands while preventing new clean energy projects.

== Overview ==
The ACHP was created by the National Historic Preservation Act (NHPA) of 1966, which sets forth most of the ACHP's duties and authorities. Passage of the NHPA was a watershed event that launched a transformation of the federal government from an agent of indifference—frequently responsible for the needless loss of historic resources—to a facilitator, an agent of thoughtful change, and a responsible steward of historic properties for future generations.

The ACHP, created by the NHPA, is the only federal agency whose sole mission is promoting the preservation of the nation's diverse historic resources.

In keeping with these concepts, the ACHP is responsible for overseeing the federal historic preservation review process established by Section 106 of the NHPA (now codified as 54 U.S.C. 306108). Section 106 requires federal agencies to consider the effects of federal projects on historic properties and to provide the ACHP an opportunity to weigh in on project impacts.

Based on authority granted by the NHPA, the ACHP has issued regulations (36 CFR Part 800) that spell out how agencies should meet their Section 106 responsibilities efficiently and effectively while giving due consideration to the historic places that communities value. Administering application of the Section 106 review process is a major ACHP responsibility.

== Mission ==
In January 2011, ACHP membership adopted the following Mission Statement:

The Advisory Council on Historic Preservation promotes the preservation, enhancement, and sustainable use of our nation's diverse historic resources, and advises the president and the Congress on national historic preservation policy.

== Membership ==
The ACHP's 24 statutorily designated members, including the chairman who heads the agency, address policy issues, direct program initiatives, and make recommendations regarding historic preservation to the president, Congress, and heads of other federal agencies. Members meet several times per year to conduct business. ACHP members are from various federal agencies, local and state government, the public, and historic preservation organizations.

- Four members of the general public and four historic preservation experts are appointed by the president, including the chairman and vice chairman.
- A member of an Indian tribe or Native Hawaiian organization, a governor, and a mayor are appointed by the president.
- Two federal agency heads and the architect of the Capitol are permanent members of ACHP.
- Seven federal agency heads are designated by the president to terms on ACHP.
- Ex-officio representatives of national preservation organizations round out ACHP's membership.

== Chairman ==
In March 2018, Aimee Jorjani was nominated by President Donald Trump as the first full-time chairman of the Advisory Council on Historic Preservation (ACHP), earning Senate confirmation in June 2019. Jorjani's term of office was due to end on June 10, 2021. President Joe Biden asked for Jorjani's resignation on February 5, 2021.

President Joe Biden nominated Sara Bronin as the next chair of the Advisory Council on Historic Preservation on June 24, 2021. Bronin was confirmed by the Senate on December 22, 2022.

During Trump's second term he did not initially nominate a chairman, rather appointing a vice chairman Travis Voyles who would serve one year until June 2026.

=== List of chairmen of the Advisory Council on Historic Preservation ===
This is an incomplete list of chairmen since 1966. Until 2019, all chairmen were appointed directly by the president. From 2018 the chairman has been nominated by the president and confirmed with the advice and consent of the Senate:

Name	Assumed office	Left office	President served under
Sylvester K. Stevens; Appointed for two terms	1967	June 10, 1974	Richard Nixon; Gerald R. Ford
Clement M. Silvestro	1974	June 10, 1978	Gerald R. Ford; Jimmy Carter
Richard H. Jenrette	January 27, 1978	June 10, 1981	Jimmy Carter; Ronald Reagan
Alexander Aldrich	June 23, 1981	June 10, 1985	Ronald Reagan
Cynthia Grassby Baker	July 19, 1985	1988	Ronald Reagan
John F. W. Rogers	March 15, 1988	June 10, 1991	George H. W. Bush
Rev. John C. Harper	May 4, 1992	June 10, 1995	George H. W. Bush
Catherine B. Slater; Appointed for two terms	July 23, 1995	June 10, 2001	Bill Clinton
John L. Nau; Appointed for two terms	November 2001	June 10, 2010	George W. Bush; Barack Obama
Milford Wayne Donaldson; Appointed for two terms	June 10, 2010	July 22, 2019	Barack Obama; Donald Trump
Aimee K. Jorjani	July 22, 2019	February 5, 2021	Donald Trump
Vacant	February 5, 2021	January 31, 2023	
Sara Bronin	January 31, 2023	December 31, 2024	Joe Biden

== Activities ==
The ACHP's major program offices are reflected in its organizational structure.

The Office of Federal Agency Programs participates in Section 106 reviews, develops and implements program improvement initiatives, provides technical assistance and guidance for Section 106 users, and works to improve federal agency and stakeholder understanding of Section 106. It also oversees implementation of Section 3 of Executive Order 13287, "Preserve America," and develops and administers the ACHP's training program, including delivery of classroom courses, webinars, and e-learning.

The Office of Native American Affairs advises the ACHP leadership and staff on policy and program matters related to Native American issues, and offers technical assistance and outreach for tribal and Native Hawaiian Organization consultation under the Section 106 review process.

The Office of Preservation Initiatives (OPI) analyzes legislation, develops policy recommendations, oversees special studies and reports, and implements programs related to national preservation benefits such as community development, economic impacts, sustainability, and tourism. It oversees the Preserve America Program.

The Office of Communications, Education, and Outreach creates and conveys the ACHP's message to partners, stakeholders, and the general public via print and electronic media, meets information requests from citizens and Congress, handles media relations, and manages ACHP outreach, awards and publications.

A professional staff, which supports ACHP's daily operations, is headquartered in Washington, D.C.

== Terms ==
The ACHP members who are the heads of other federal agencies serve on the ACHP as long as they hold their head of agency positions. The president of the National Conference of State Historic Preservation Officers, the chairman of the National Trust for Historic Preservation, and the architect of the Capitol are ex officio members of the ACHP, and therefore serve on the ACHP as long as they hold their mentioned positions. Mayors and governors serve for terms that last as long as they are serving in an elected capacity as mayor or governor but no longer than four years. The citizen (including the chairman), expert, and Indian tribe/Native Hawaiian organization members of the ACHP all serve four-year terms.
