= Seewarte Seamounts =

Group of extinct volcanoes in the Atlantic Ocean

- The Seewarte Seamounts and the Azores Plateau to the north

Location
- Location: North Atlantic Ocean
- Coordinates: 32°N 29°W

The Seewarte Seamounts, also known as the Seewarte Seamount Chain, Atlantis-Great Meteor Seamount Chain and the Atlantis-Plato-Cruiser-Great Meteor Seamount Group, is a north-south trending group of extinct submarine volcanoes in the northern Atlantic Ocean south-southeast of the Corner Rise Seamounts.

The Seewarte Seamounts have been interpreted to have formed as a result of the African Plate traveling over the New England hotspot.

== Seamounts ==
The Seewarte Seamounts include:

- Closs Seamount
- Little Meteor Seamount
- Great Meteor Seamount
- Hyères Seamount
- Irving Seamount
- Cruiser Tablemount
- Plato Seamount
- Atlantis Seamount
- Tyro Seamount

== See also ==
- Corner Rise Seamounts
- New England Seamounts
