= 1957 in the United States =

- Decades: 1930s; 1940s; 1950s; 1960s; 1970s
- See also: History of the United States (1945–1964); Timeline of United States history (1950–1969); List of years in the United States

Events from the year 1957 in the United States.

== Incumbents ==
=== Federal government ===
- President: Dwight D. Eisenhower (R-Kansas/New York then Kansas/Pennsylvania)
- Vice President: Richard Nixon (R-California)
- Chief Justice: Earl Warren (California)
- Speaker of the House of Representatives: Sam Rayburn (D–Texas)
- Senate Majority Leader: Lyndon B. Johnson (D-Texas)
- Congress: 84th (until January 3), 85th (starting January 3)

==== State governments ====
Governors and lieutenant governors

=== Governors ===
- Governor of Alabama: Jim Folsom (Democratic)
- Governor of Arizona: Ernest McFarland (Democratic)
- Governor of Arkansas: Orval Faubus (Democratic)
- Governor of California: Goodwin Knight (Republican)
- Governor of Colorado: Edwin C. Johnson (Democratic) (until January 8), Stephen L. R. McNichols (Democratic) (starting January 8)
- Governor of Connecticut: Abraham A. Ribicoff (Democratic)
- Governor of Delaware: J. Caleb Boggs (Republican)
- Governor of Florida: LeRoy Collins (Democratic)
- Governor of Georgia: Marvin Griffin (Democratic)
- Governor of Idaho: Robert E. Smylie (Republican)
- Governor of Illinois: William G. Stratton (Republican)
- Governor of Indiana: George N. Craig (Republican) (until January 14), Harold W. Handley (Republican) (starting January 14)
- Governor of Iowa: Leo A. Hoegh (Republican) (until January 17), Herschel C. Loveless (Democratic) (starting January 17)
- Governor of Kansas:
  - until January 3: Fred Hall (Republican)
  - January 3 – 14: John McCuish (Republican)
  - starting January 14: George Docking (Democratic)
- Governor of Kentucky: Happy Chandler (Democratic)
- Governor of Louisiana: Earl K. Long (Democratic)
- Governor of Maine: Edmund Muskie (Democratic)
- Governor of Maryland: Theodore R. McKeldin (Republican)
- Governor of Massachusetts: Christian A. Herter (Republican) (until January 3), Foster Furcolo (Democratic) (starting January 3)
- Governor of Michigan: G. Mennen Williams (Democratic)
- Governor of Minnesota: Orville L. Freeman (Democratic)
- Governor of Mississippi: James P. Coleman (Democratic)
- Governor of Missouri: Phil M. Donnelly (Democratic) (until January 14), James T. Blair Jr. (Democratic) (starting January 14)
- Governor of Montana: J. Hugo Aronson (Republican)
- Governor of Nebraska: Victor Anderson (Republican)
- Governor of Nevada: Charles H. Russell (Republican)
- Governor of New Hampshire: Lane Dwinell (Republican)
- Governor of New Jersey: Robert B. Meyner (Democratic)
- Governor of New Mexico: John F. Simms (Democratic) (until January 1), Edwin L. Mechem (Republican) (starting January 1)
- Governor of New York: W. Averell Harriman (Democratic)
- Governor of North Carolina: Luther H. Hodges (Democratic)
- Governor of North Dakota: Clarence Norman Brunsdale (Republican) (until January 3), John E. Davis (Republican) (starting January 3)
- Governor of Ohio:
  - until January 3: Frank J. Lausche (Democratic)
  - January 3 – 14: John William Brown (Republican)
  - starting January 14: C. William O'Neill (Republican)
- Governor of Oklahoma: Raymond D. Gary (Democratic)
- Governor of Oregon: Elmo Smith (Republican) (until January 14), Robert D. Holmes (Democratic) (starting January 14)
- Governor of Pennsylvania: George M. Leader (Democratic)
- Governor of Rhode Island: Dennis J. Roberts (Democratic)
- Governor of South Carolina: George Bell Timmerman Jr. (Democratic)
- Governor of South Dakota: Joe Foss (Republican)
- Governor of Tennessee: Frank G. Clement (Democratic)
- Governor of Texas: Allan Shivers (Democratic) (until January 15), Price Daniel (Democratic) (starting January 15)
- Governor of Utah: J. Bracken Lee (Republican) (until January 7), George Dewey Clyde (Republican) (starting January 7)
- Governor of Vermont: Joseph B. Johnson (Republican)
- Governor of Virginia: Thomas Bahnson Stanley (Democratic)
- Governor of Washington: Arthur B. Langlie (Republican) (until January 16), Albert D. Rosellini (Democratic) (starting January 16)
- Governor of Wisconsin: Walter J. Kohler Jr. (Republican) (until January 7), Vernon W. Thomson (Republican) (starting January 7)
- Governor of Wyoming: Milward L. Simpson (Republican)
- Governor of West Virginia: William C. Marland (Democratic) (until January 14), Cecil H. Underwood (Republican) (starting January 14)

=== Lieutenant governors ===
- Lieutenant Governor of Alabama: William G. Hardwick (Democratic)
- Lieutenant Governor of Arkansas: Nathan Green Gordon (Democratic)
- Lieutenant Governor of California: Harold J. Powers (Republican)
- Lieutenant Governor of Colorado: Stephen L. R. McNichols (Democratic) (until January 8), Frank L. Hays (Republican) (starting January 8)
- Lieutenant Governor of Connecticut: Charles W. Jewett (Democratic)
- Lieutenant Governor of Delaware: John W. Rollins (Democratic) (until January 15), David P. Buckson (Republican) (starting January 15)
- Lieutenant Governor of Georgia: S. Ernest Vandiver (Democratic)
- Lieutenant Governor of Idaho: J. Berkeley Larsen (Republican)
- Lieutenant Governor of Illinois: John William Chapman (Republican)
- Lieutenant Governor of Indiana: Harold W. Handley (Republican) (until January 15), Crawford F. Parker (Republican) (starting January 15)
- Lieutenant Governor of Iowa: Leo Elthon (Republican) (until January 17), William H. Nicholas (Republican) (starting January 17)
- Lieutenant Governor of Kansas: John McCuish (Republican) (until January 8), Joseph W. Henkle Sr. (Democratic) (starting January 8)
- Lieutenant Governor of Kentucky: Harry Lee Waterfield (Democratic)
- Lieutenant Governor of Louisiana: Lether Frazar (Democratic)
- Lieutenant Governor of Massachusetts: Sumner G. Whittier (Democratic) (until January 3), Robert F. Murphy (Democratic) (starting January 3)
- Lieutenant Governor of Michigan: Philip A. Hart (Democratic)
- Lieutenant Governor of Minnesota: Karl Rolvaag (Democratic)
- Lieutenant Governor of Mississippi: Carroll Gartin (Democratic)
- Lieutenant Governor of Missouri: James T. Blair Jr. (Democratic) (until January 14), Edward V. Long (Democratic) (starting January 14)
- Lieutenant Governor of Montana: George M. Gosman (Republican) (until month and day unknown), Paul Cannon (Democratic) (starting month and day unknown)
- Lieutenant Governor of Nebraska: vacant (until January 10), Dwight Burney (Republican) (starting January 10)
- Lieutenant Governor of Nevada: Rex Bell (Republican)
- Lieutenant Governor of New Mexico: Joseph Montoya (Democratic) (until April), vacant (starting April)
- Lieutenant Governor of New York: George DeLuca (Democratic)
- Lieutenant Governor of North Carolina: vacant (until month and day unknown), Luther E. Barnhardt (Democratic) (starting month and day unknown)
- Lieutenant Governor of North Dakota: Clarence P. Dahl (Republican) (until January 9), Francis Clyde Duffy (Republican) (starting January 9)
- Lieutenant Governor of Ohio:
  - until January 3: John William Brown (Republican)
  - January 3 – 14: vacant
  - starting January 14: Paul M. Herbert (Republican)
- Lieutenant Governor of Oklahoma: Cowboy Pink Williams (Democratic)
- Lieutenant Governor of Pennsylvania: Roy E. Furman (Democratic)
- Lieutenant Governor of Rhode Island: vacant (until month and day unknown), Armand H. Cote (Democratic) (starting month and day unknown)
- Lieutenant Governor of South Carolina: Ernest Hollings (Democratic)
- Lieutenant Governor of South Dakota: L. Roy Houck (Republican)
- Lieutenant Governor of Tennessee: Jared Maddux (Democratic)
- Lieutenant Governor of Texas: Ben Ramsey (Democratic)
- Lieutenant Governor of Vermont: Consuelo N. Bailey (Republican) (until January 10), Robert T. Stafford (Republican) (starting January 10)
- Lieutenant Governor of Virginia: Allie Edward Stokes Stephens (Democratic)
- Lieutenant Governor of Washington: Emmett T. Anderson (Republican) (until January 16), John Cherberg (Democratic) (starting January 16)
- Lieutenant Governor of Wisconsin: Warren P. Knowles (Republican)

== Events ==
=== January ===
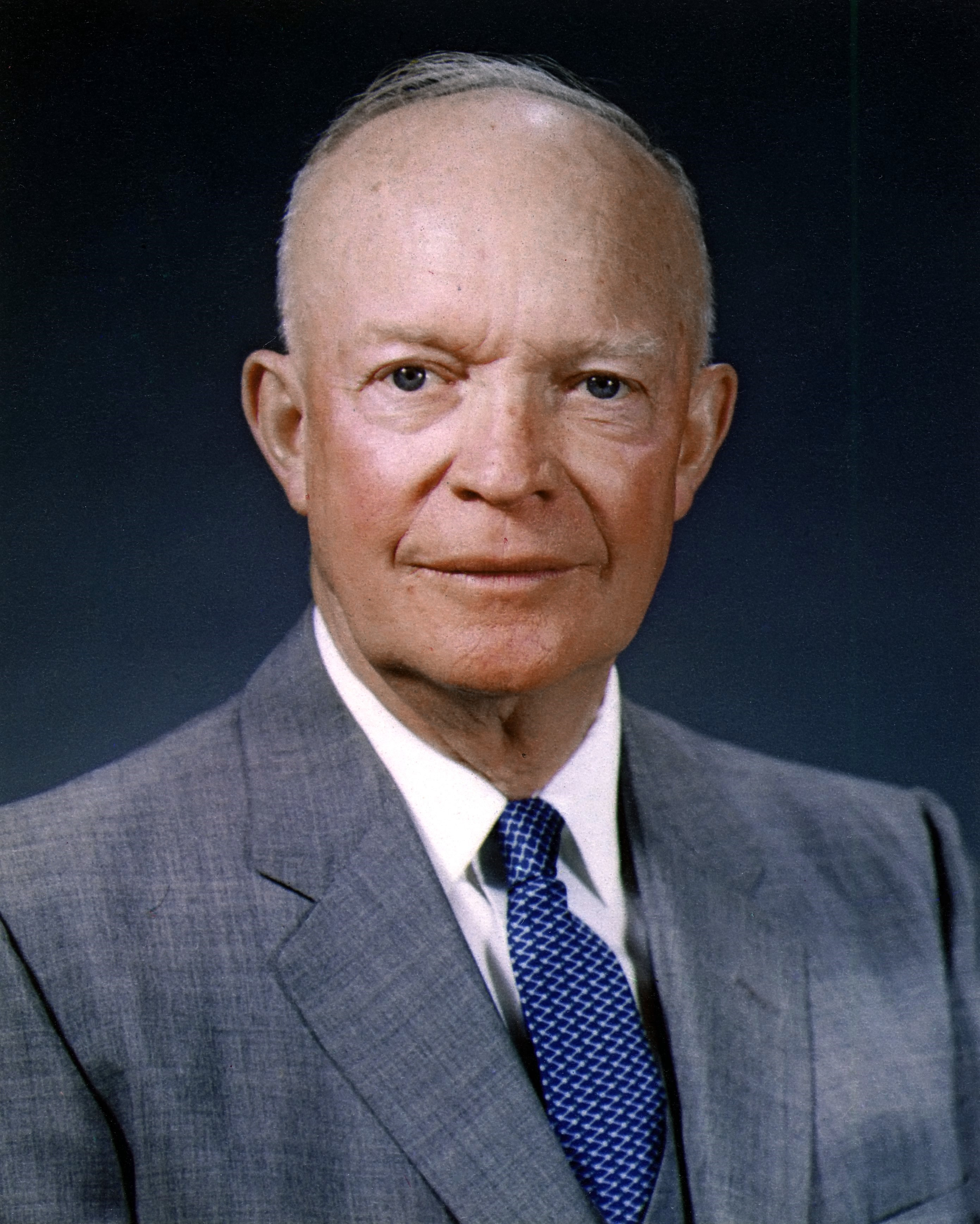
Dwight D. Eisenhower, the 34th president of the United States, began his second term on January 20

- January 2 – The San Francisco and Los Angeles stock exchanges merge to form the Pacific Coast Stock Exchange.
- January 6 – Elvis Presley appears on The Ed Sullivan Show for the third and final time. He is only shown from the waist up, even during the gospel segment, singing "Peace In The Valley". Ed Sullivan describes Elvis thus: "This is a real decent, fine boy. We've never had a pleasanter experience on our show with a big name than we've had with you. You're thoroughly alright."
- January 16 – Global hotel brand Marriott opens its first hotel, the Marriott Motor Hotel in Arlington, Virginia.
- January 20 – Dwight D. Eisenhower and Richard Nixon are inaugurated for a second term as President of the United States and Vice President of the United States respectively.
- January 22 – The New York City "Mad Bomber", George Metesky, is arrested in Waterbury, Connecticut, and charged with planting more than 30 bombs.
- January 23 – Ku Klux Klan members force truck driver Willie Edwards to jump off a bridge into the Alabama River; he drowns as a result.
- January 31 – Pacoima aircraft accident: Three students on a junior high school playground in Pacoima, California, are among the 8 persons killed following a mid-air collision between a Douglas DC-7 airliner and a Northrop F-89 Scorpion fighter jet, in the skies above the San Fernando Valley section of Los Angeles.

=== February ===
- February 4 – The first nuclear-powered submarine, USS Nautilus (SSN-571), logs its 60,000th nautical mile, matching the endurance of the fictional Nautilus described in Jules Verne's 1870 novel Twenty Thousand Leagues Under the Seas.
- February 17 – The Warrenton Nursing Home fire in Missouri kills 72 people.
- February 23 – Charlie Brandt, serial killer (d. 2004)
- February 25 – The "Boy In The Box" is discovered along a sidewalk in Philadelphia. The murder victim is described as Caucasian in appearance and 4 to 6 years old; the boy was identified as Joseph Augustus Zarelli in 2022.

=== March ===
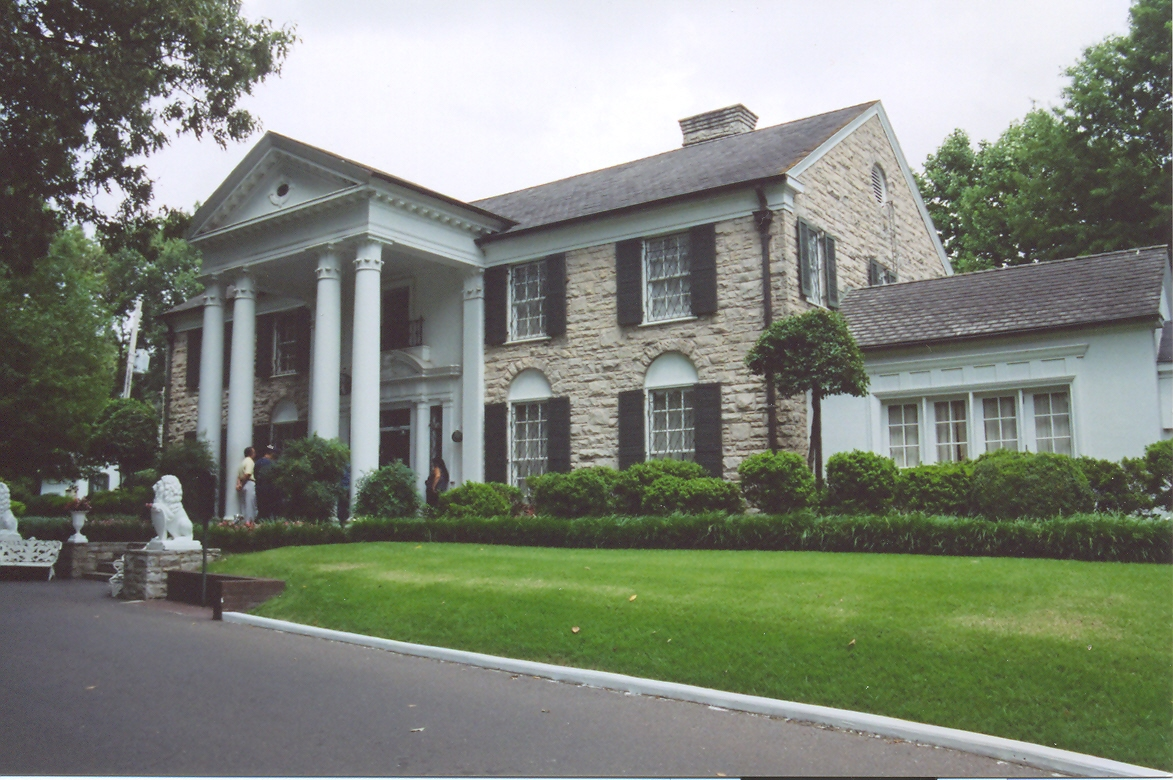
March 26: Elvis Presley buys Graceland

- March 4 – Standard & Poor's first publishes the S&P 500 Index in the United States.
- March 7 – The United States Congress approves the Eisenhower Doctrine on assistance to Communist-threatened foreign regimes.
- March 10 – Floodgates of The Dalles Dam are closed, inundating Celilo Falls and ancient Native American fisheries along the Columbia River in Oregon.
- March 13 – The U.S. Federal Bureau of Investigation arrests Jimmy Hoffa and charges him with bribery.
- March 22 – The 5.7 M_{w} San Francisco earthquake shook the Bay Area in California with a maximum Mercalli intensity of VII (Very strong), causing $1 million in losses, one death and forty injuries.
- March 25 – Copies of Allen Ginsberg's Howl and Other Poems (first published November 1, 1956), printed in the UK, are seized by United States Customs Service officials in San Francisco, on the grounds of obscenity. On October 3, in People v. Ferlinghetti, a subsequent prosecution of publisher Lawrence Ferlinghetti, the work is ruled not to be obscene.
- March 26 – 22-year-old Elvis Presley buys Graceland on 3734 Bellevue Boulevard (Highway 51 South) for $100,000. He and his family move from the house on 1034 Audubon Drive.
- March 27 – The 29th Academy Awards ceremony, hosted by Jerry Lewis and Celeste Holm, is held at RKO Pantages Theatre in Hollywood. The ceremony started a trend toward blockbusters and colorful spectaculars, with Michael Anderson's Around the World in 80 Days winning Best Motion Picture chief among them. The film is tied with Walter Lang's The King and I for the most awards with five, while George Stevens' Giant receives the most nominations with ten, including Stevens' second Best Director win.
- March 31 – Rodgers and Hammerstein's Cinderella, the team's only musical written especially for television, is telecast live and in color by CBS, starring Julie Andrews in the title role. The production is seen by millions, but this 1957 version is not telecast again for more than 40 years, when a kinescope of it is shown.

=== April ===
- April 12 – Allen Ginsberg's poem Howl, printed in the United Kingdom, is seized by U.S. customs officials on the grounds of obscenity.

=== May ===
- May 2
  - Iron Liege, at 8–1, wins the Kentucky Derby in one of the most eventful Derbys ever.
  - Vincent Gigante fails to assassinate mafioso Frank Costello in Manhattan.
- May 3 – Brooklyn Dodgers owner Walter O'Malley agrees to move the team from Brooklyn, to Los Angeles.
- May 16 – Walt Whitman Bridge opens between Philadelphia and New Jersey.

=== June ===
- June 1 – Three-year-old thoroughbred Gallant Man wins the Peter Pan Stakes, at Belmont Park.
- June 15 – Oklahoma celebrates its semi-centennial statehood. A brand new 1957 Plymouth Belvedere is buried in a time capsule (to be opened 50 years later on June 15, 2007).
- June 20 – The 1957 Fargo Tornado caused 12 deaths.
- June 23 – Royal Ice Cream sit-in
- June 25 – The United Church of Christ is formed in Cleveland, Ohio, by the merger of the Congregational Christian Churches and the Evangelical and Reformed Church.
- June 27 – Hurricane Audrey demolishes Cameron, Louisiana, killing 400 people.

=== July ===
- July 9 – Elvis Presley's Loving You opens in movie theaters.
- July 16 – United States Marine Major John Glenn flies an F8U supersonic jet from California to New York in 3 hours, 23 minutes and 8 seconds, setting a new transcontinental speed record.

=== August ===
- August 5 – American Bandstand, a local dance show produced by WFIL-TV in Philadelphia, joins the ABC Television Network.
- August 21 – U.S. President Dwight D. Eisenhower announces a 2-year suspension of nuclear testing.
- August 28 – United States Senator Strom Thurmond (D-SC) sets the record for the longest filibuster with his 24-hour, 18-minute speech railing against a civil rights bill.

=== September ===
- September 4
  - American Civil Rights Movement – Governor Orville Faubus of Arkansas calls out the National Guard of the United States to prevent the "Little Rock Nine" African American students from enrolling in Little Rock Central High School.
  - The Ford Motor Company introduces the Edsel on what the company proclaims as "E Day".
- September 5 – Viking Press publishes On the Road by Jack Kerouac.
- September 9
  - Civil Rights Act of 1957 enacted, setting up the United States Commission on Civil Rights.
  - Catholic Memorial High School opens its doors for the first time in Boston, Massachusetts.
- September 23 – The Academy Award-winning movie The Three Faces of Eve is released.
- September 24 – U.S. President Dwight D. Eisenhower sends federal troops to Arkansas to provide safe passage into Little Rock Central High School for the Little Rock Nine.
- September 26 – West Side Story, a new musical by Leonard Bernstein, Jerome Robbins, Arthur Laurents and Stephen Sondheim opens at the Winter Garden Theatre on Broadway.

=== October ===
- October 4 – The sitcom Leave It to Beaver premieres on CBS.
- October 9 – Neil H. McElroy is sworn in as United States Secretary of Defense.
- October 10
  - U.S. President Dwight D. Eisenhower apologizes to the finance minister of Ghana, Komla Agbeli Gbdemah, after he is refused service in a restaurant in Dover, Delaware.
  - Ayn Rand's novel Atlas Shrugged is published.
  - The Milwaukee Braves defeat the New York Yankees, 4 games to 3, to win their 2nd World Series Title.
- October 11 – The orbit of the last stage of the R-7 Semyorka rocket (carrying Sputnik I) is first successfully calculated on an IBM 704 computer during Operation Moonwatch, Cambridge, Massachusetts.
- October 21 – The U.S. military sustains its first combat fatality in Vietnam, Army Capt. Hank Cramer of the 1st Special Forces Group.
- October 25 – Mafia boss Albert Anastasia is assassinated in a barber shop, at the Park Sheraton Hotel in New York City.
- October 31 – Toyota begins exporting vehicles to the U.S., beginning with the Toyota Crown and the Toyota Land Cruiser

=== November ===
- November 1
  - The Mackinac Bridge, the world's longest suspension bridge between anchorages at the time, opens to traffic connecting Michigan's two peninsulas.
  - The first (westbound) tube of the Hampton Roads Bridge–Tunnel, linking Norfolk and Hampton, Virginia, opens at a cost of $44 million.
- November 6 – Jailhouse Rock opens nationally and Elvis Presley continues to gain more notoriety.
- November 7 – Cold War: In the United States, the Gaither Report calls for more American missiles and fallout shelters.
- November 8 – The film Jailhouse Rock opens across the U.S. to reach #3, and Elvis Presley continues to gain more notoriety.
- November 14 – Apalachin Meeting: American Mafia leaders meet in Apalachin, New York, at the house of Joseph Barbara; the meeting is broken up by a curious patrolman.
- November 16
  - Edward Gein murders his last victim, Bernice Worden of Plainfield, Wisconsin.
  - Oklahoma celebrates its 50th anniversary of statehood.
  - Notre Dame beats the Oklahoma Sooners 7–0 to end the longest winning streak in college football history at 47.
- November 25 – U.S. President Dwight D. Eisenhower suffers a stroke.

=== December ===
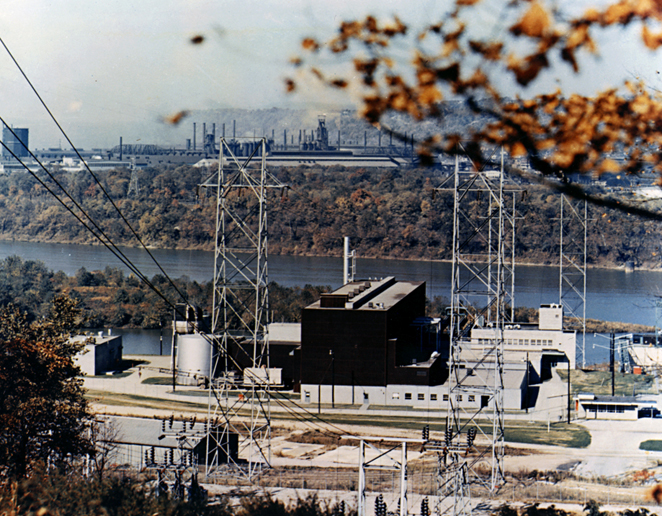
December 2: Shippingport Reactor goes online

- December 2 – Shippingport Atomic Power Station goes onstream; commercial operation begins on May 26, 1958.
- December 6 – Vanguard TV3, the first U.S. attempt to launch a satellite, fails with the rocket blowing up on the launch pad.
- December 18
  - A violent F5 tornado wipes out the entire community of Sunfield, Illinois.
  - The Bridge on the River Kwai is released in the U.S. It goes on to win the Academy Award for Best Picture. Additional Oscars go to Alec Guinness (eh Actor) and David Lean (eh Director), among others. This is Lean's first Oscar for directing.
- December 19 – Meredith Willson's classic musical The Music Man, starring Robert Preston, is premièred on Broadway.
- December 20 – The Boeing 707 airliner flies for the first time.
- December 22 – The CBS afternoon anthology series The Seven Lively Arts presents Tchaikovsky's ballet The Nutcracker on U.S. television for the first time.

=== Undated ===
- Operation Dropshot, an all-out U.S. war with the Soviet Union, is expected to be triggered by the Soviet takeover of Western Europe, the Near East and parts of Eastern Asia, as it was anticipated in 1949.

=== Ongoing ===
- Cold War (1947–1991)

== Births ==
=== January ===
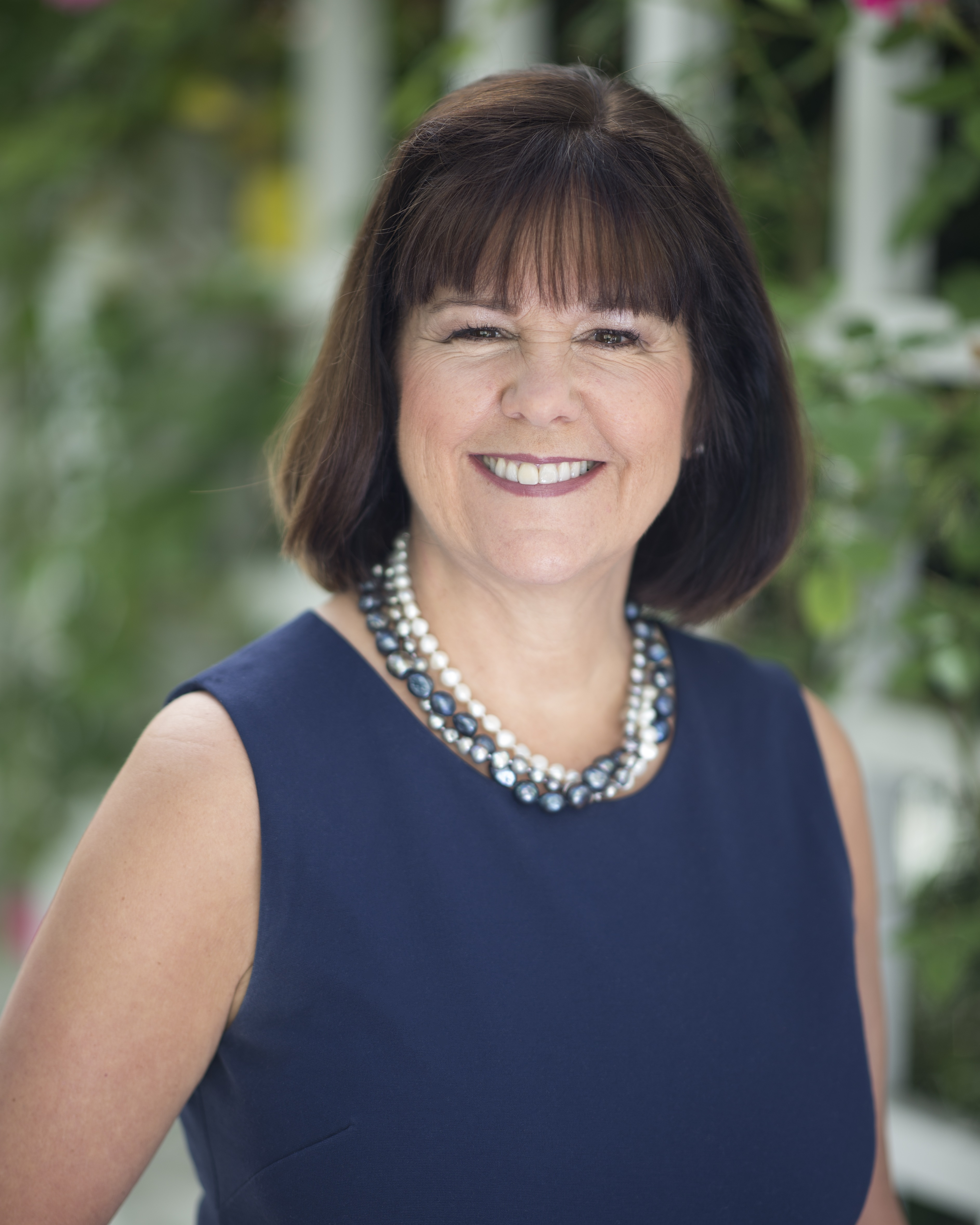
Karen Pence

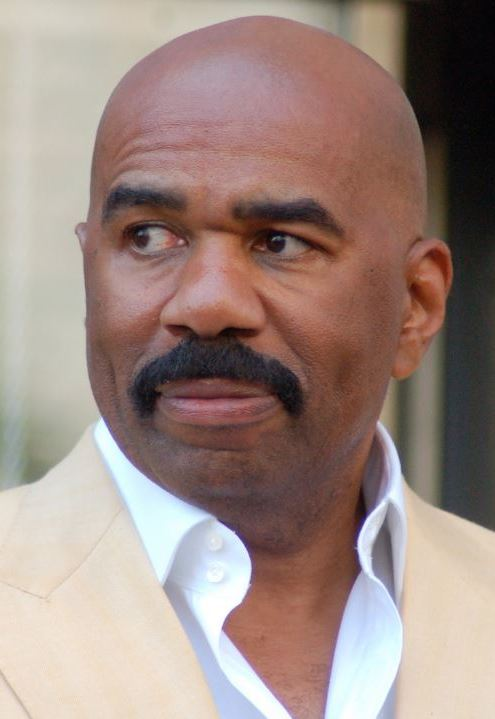
Steve Harvey

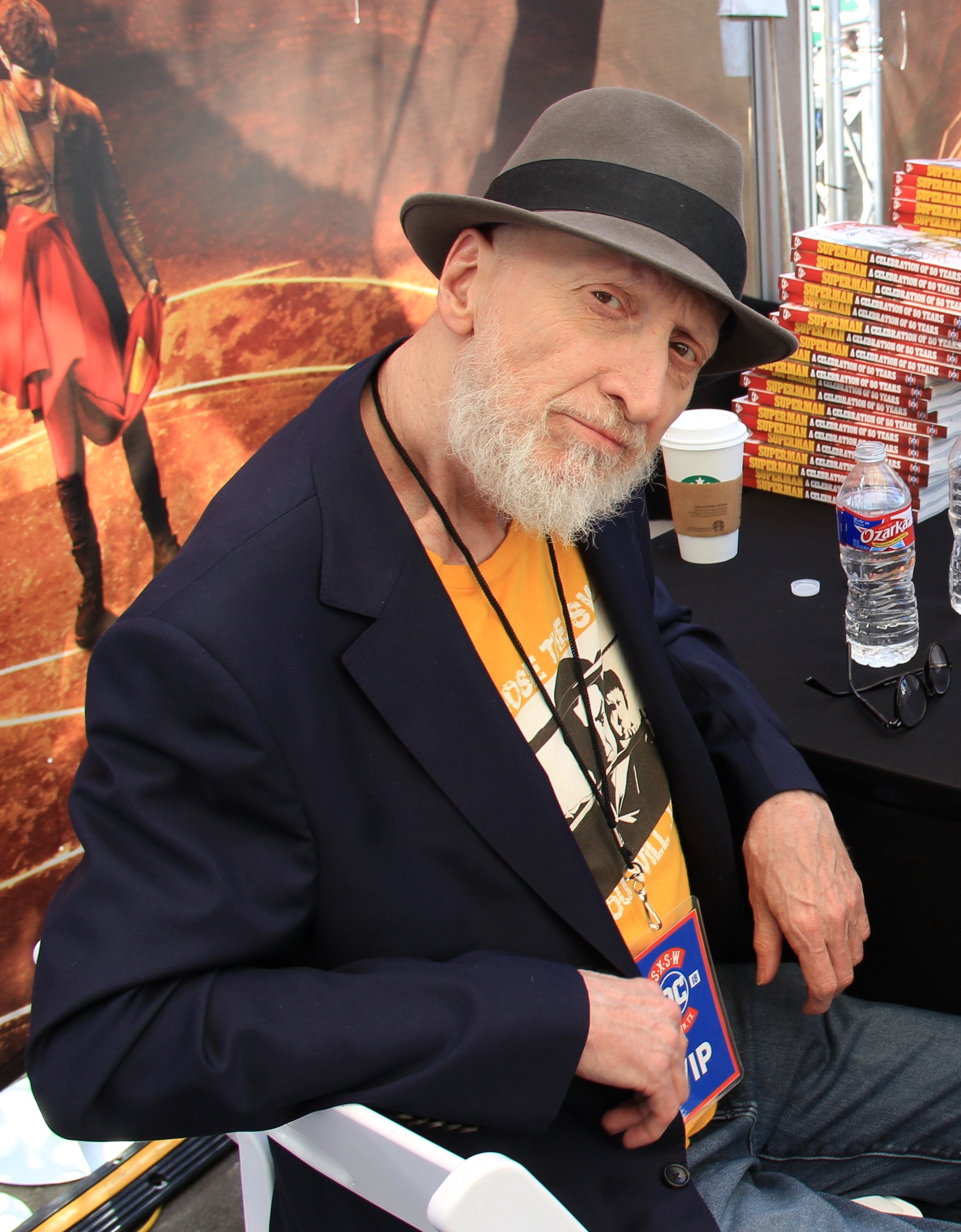
Frank Miller

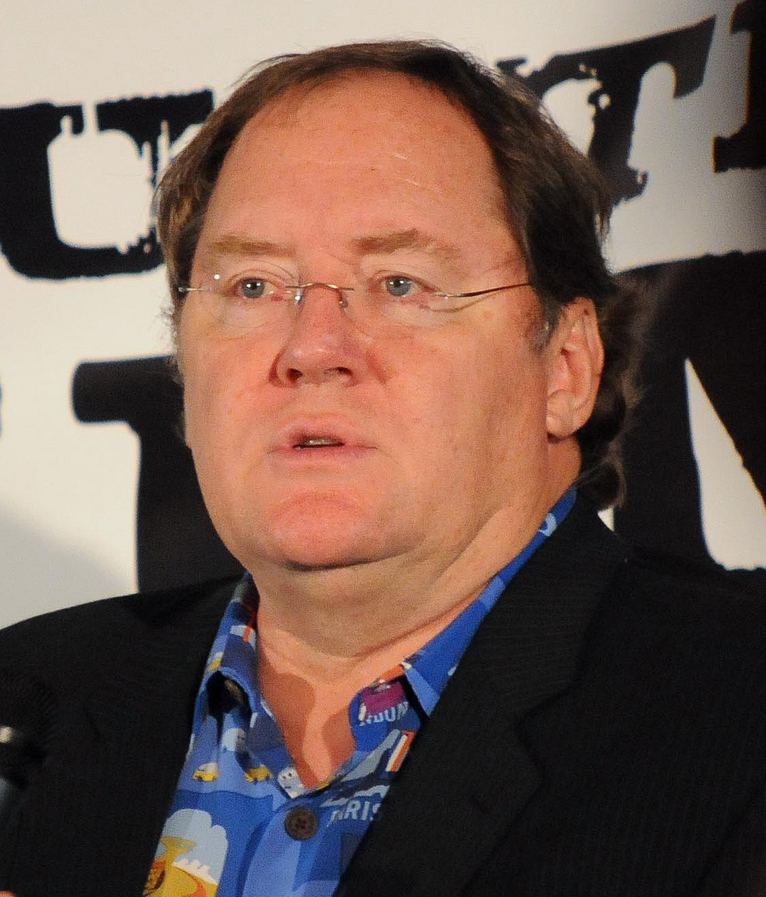
John Lasseter

- January 1
  - Mark Hurd, American businessman (d. 2019)
  - Karen Pence, American educator, and teacher, Second Lady of the United States
- January 4 – Patty Loveless, American country music singer
- January 6
  - Freddie Glenn, American spree killer and rapist
  - Nancy Lopez, American golfer
- January 7
  - Nicholson Baker, American novelist
  - Katie Couric, American television host
  - Steve Janaszak, American professional ice hockey player
- January 8
  - Dwight Clark, American football player (d. 2018)
  - David Lang, American composer
- January 12 – John Lasseter, American director, writer and animator
- January 13
  - Ralph DeLoach, American football player (d. 2022)
  - Claudia Emerson, American poet, Pulitzer Prize winner in 2006 (d. 2014)
  - Lorrie Moore, American writer
- January 15
  - Turk Schonert, American football player (d. 2019)
  - Mario Van Peebles, African-American actor and director
- January 17 – Steve Harvey, African-American comedian, television host, radio personality and actor
- January 21 – Greg Ryan, American soccer coach
- January 22 – Brian Dayett, American baseball player (d. 2025)
- January 26 – Road Warrior Hawk, American professional wrestler (d. 2003)
- January 27 – Frank Miller, American comic book writer
- January 30 – Payne Stewart, American golfer (d. 1999)

=== February ===
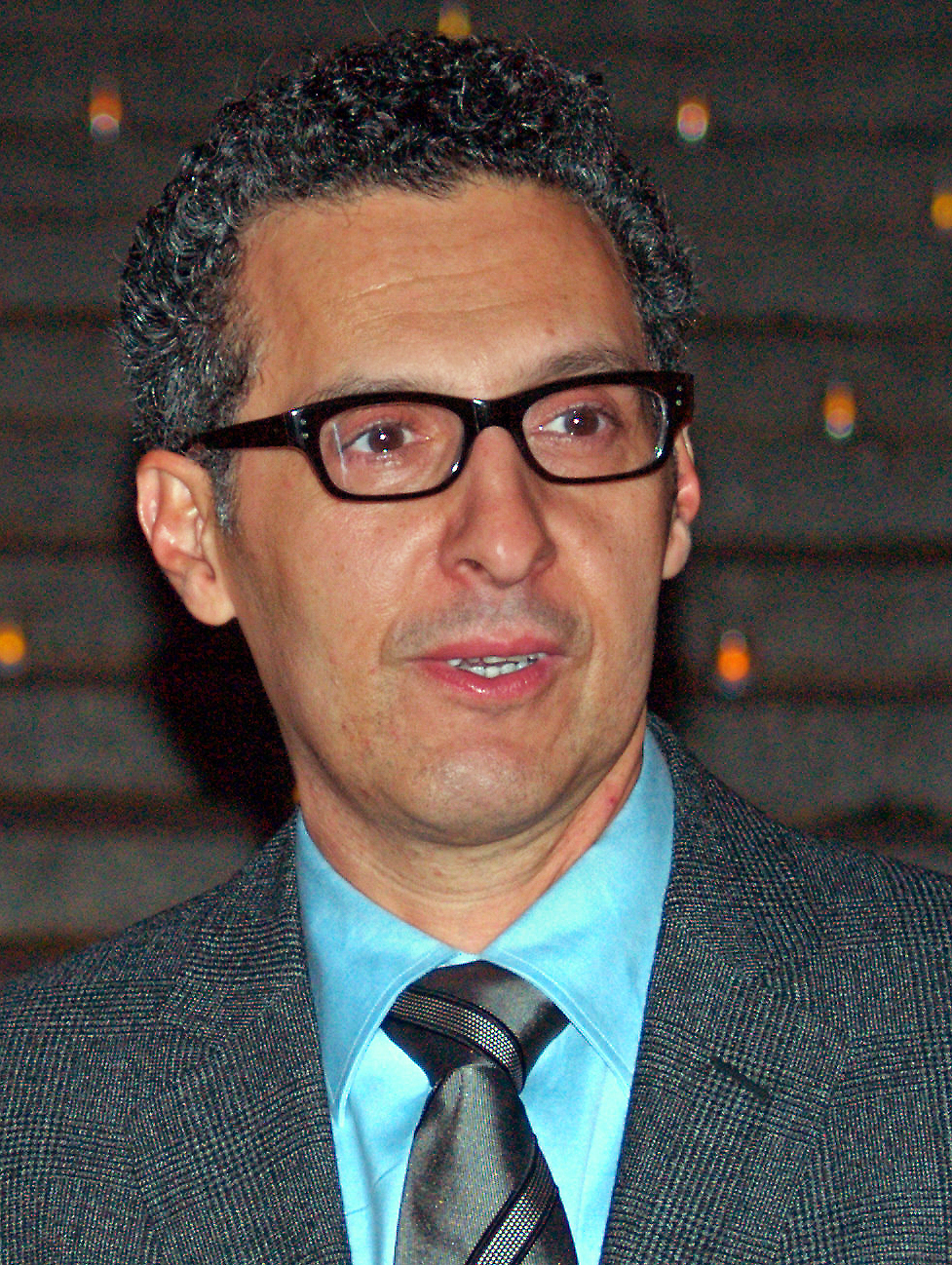
John Turturro

- February 6
  - Kathy Najimy, actress and comedian
  - Robert Townsend, African-American actor, comedian, director and writer (Hollywood Shuffle)
- February 7 – Carney Lansford, baseball player and coach
- February 8
  - Robert S. Kapito, business investor
  - Cindy Wilson, rock singer (The B-52's)
- February 14 – Alan Hunter, MTV's first video jockey
- February 15
  - Nathaniel Bar-Jonah, criminal (d. 2008)
  - Jake E. Lee, guitarist and songwriter
  - Jimmy Spencer, race car driver and sportscaster
- February 16 – LeVar Burton, African-American actor
- February 18 – Vanna White, American game show presenter (Wheel of Fortune)
- February 20 – Dean Zelinsky, American guitar designer, maker and luthier. Founder of (Dean Guitars) and (Dean Zelinsky Guitars)
- February 26
  - David Beasley, lawyer and politician, 113th Governor of South Carolina
  - Joe Mullen, ice hockey player and coach
  - Keena Rothhammer, swimmer
- February 27 – Ralph Cox, ice hockey player
- February 28 – John Turturro, actor, writer and director

=== March ===
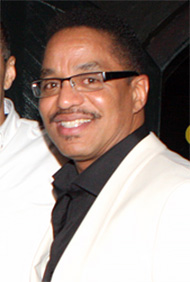
Marlon Jackson

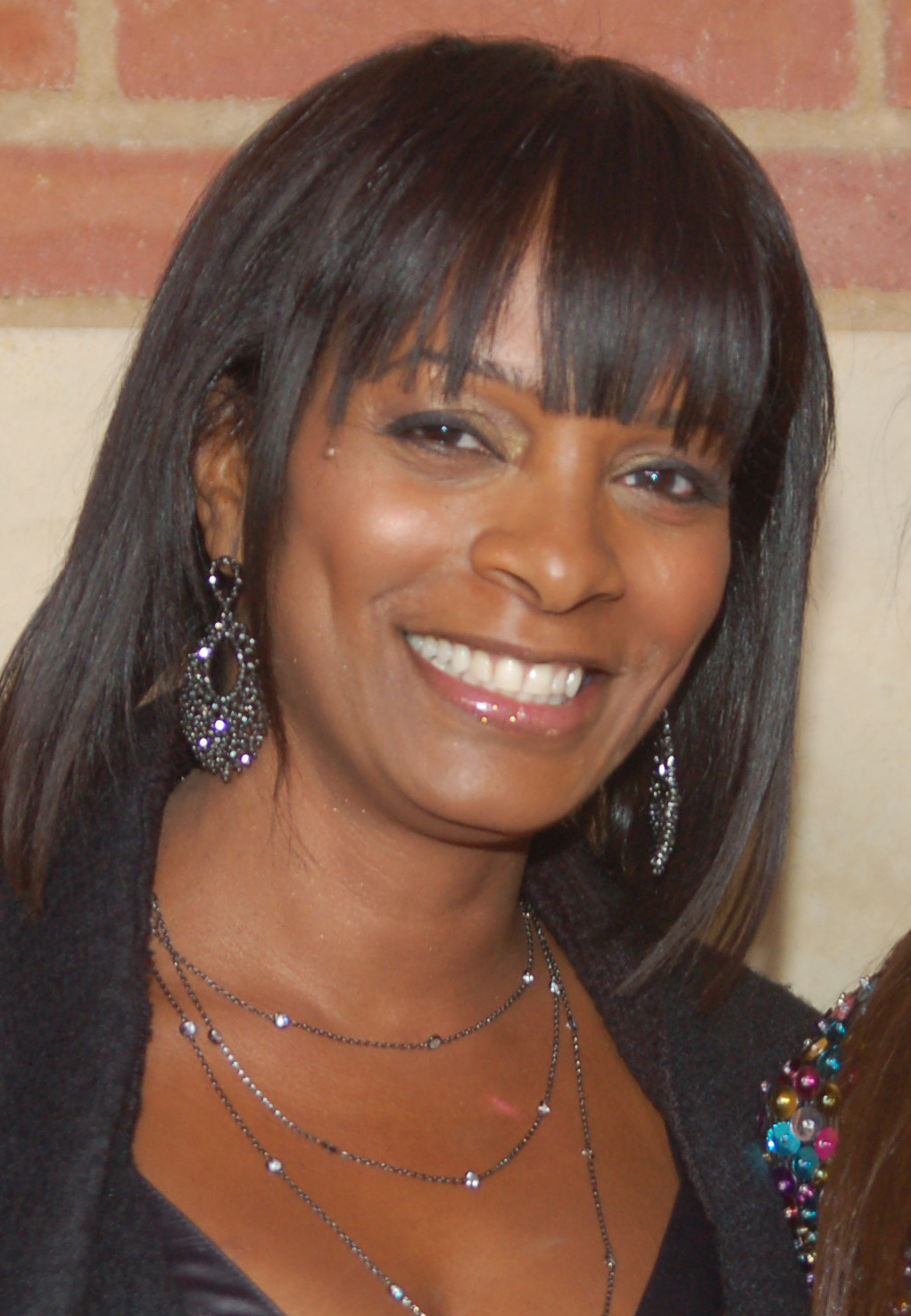
Vanessa Bell Calloway

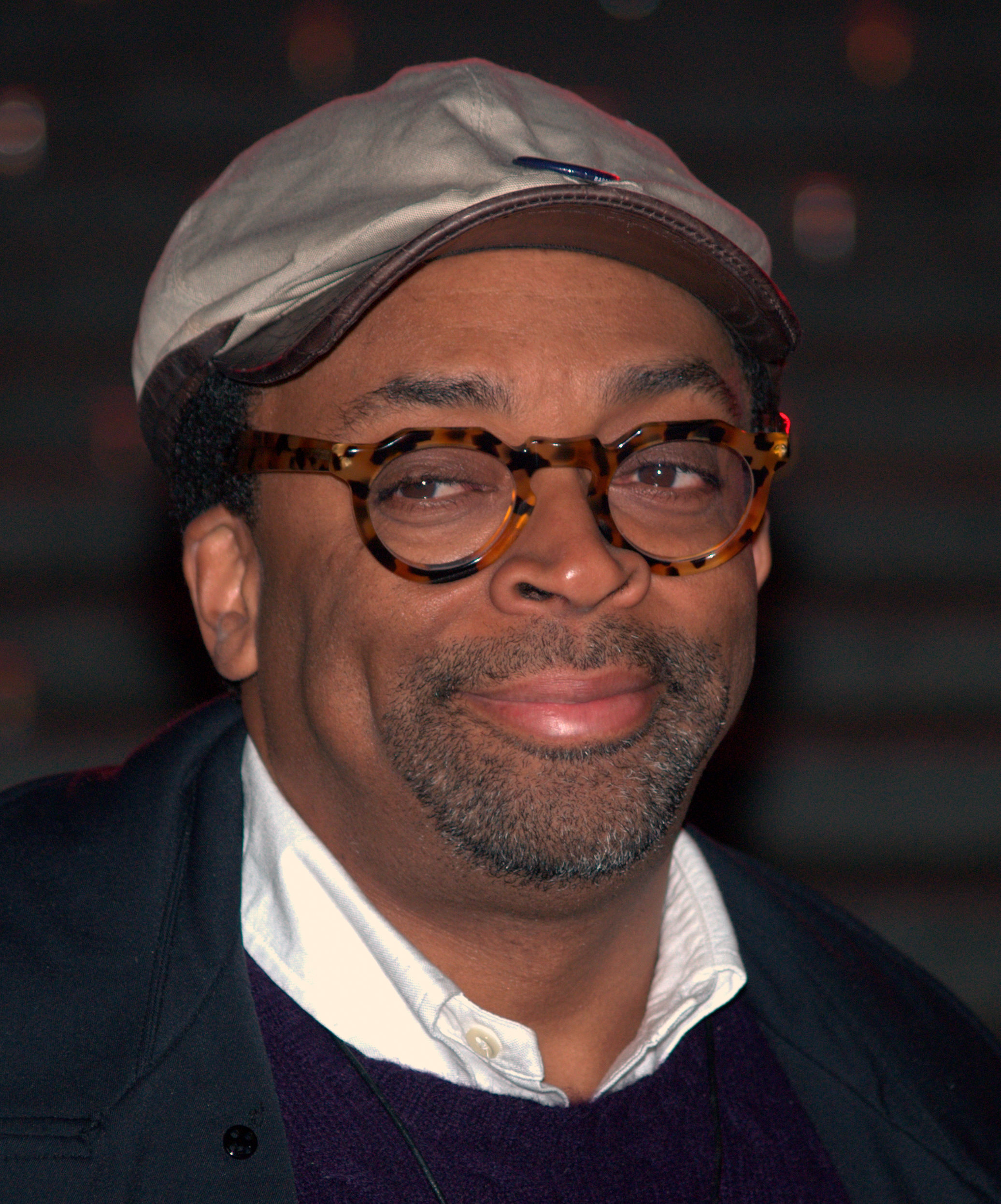
Spike Lee

- March 4
  - Jim Dwyer, American journalist, Pulitzer Prize winner (d. 2020)
  - Rick Mast, American NASCAR driver
  - Mykelti Williamson, African-American actor
- March 6 – Eddie Deezen, American voice actor, comedian
- March 12
  - Val Demings, African-American politician
  - Marlon Jackson, African-American singer
- March 13 – David Peaston, American singer (d. 2012)
- March 15 – Park Overall, American film and television actress
- March 20
  - Vanessa Bell Calloway, African-American actress
  - John Grogan, American journalist
  - Spike Lee, African-American film director and actor
  - Theresa Russell, American actress
  - Amy Aquino, American television, film, and stage actress
- March 23
  - Teresa Ganzel, American comedian and actress
  - Amanda Plummer, American actress
- March 24 – Jack Edwards, American play-by-play announcer
- March 26 – Leeza Gibbons, American television personality
- March 28
  - Paul Eiding, American actor and voice actor
  - Harvey Glance, African-American Olympic athlete (d. 2023)
- March 29 – Christopher Lambert, American actor
- March 31 – Marc McClure, American actor

=== April ===
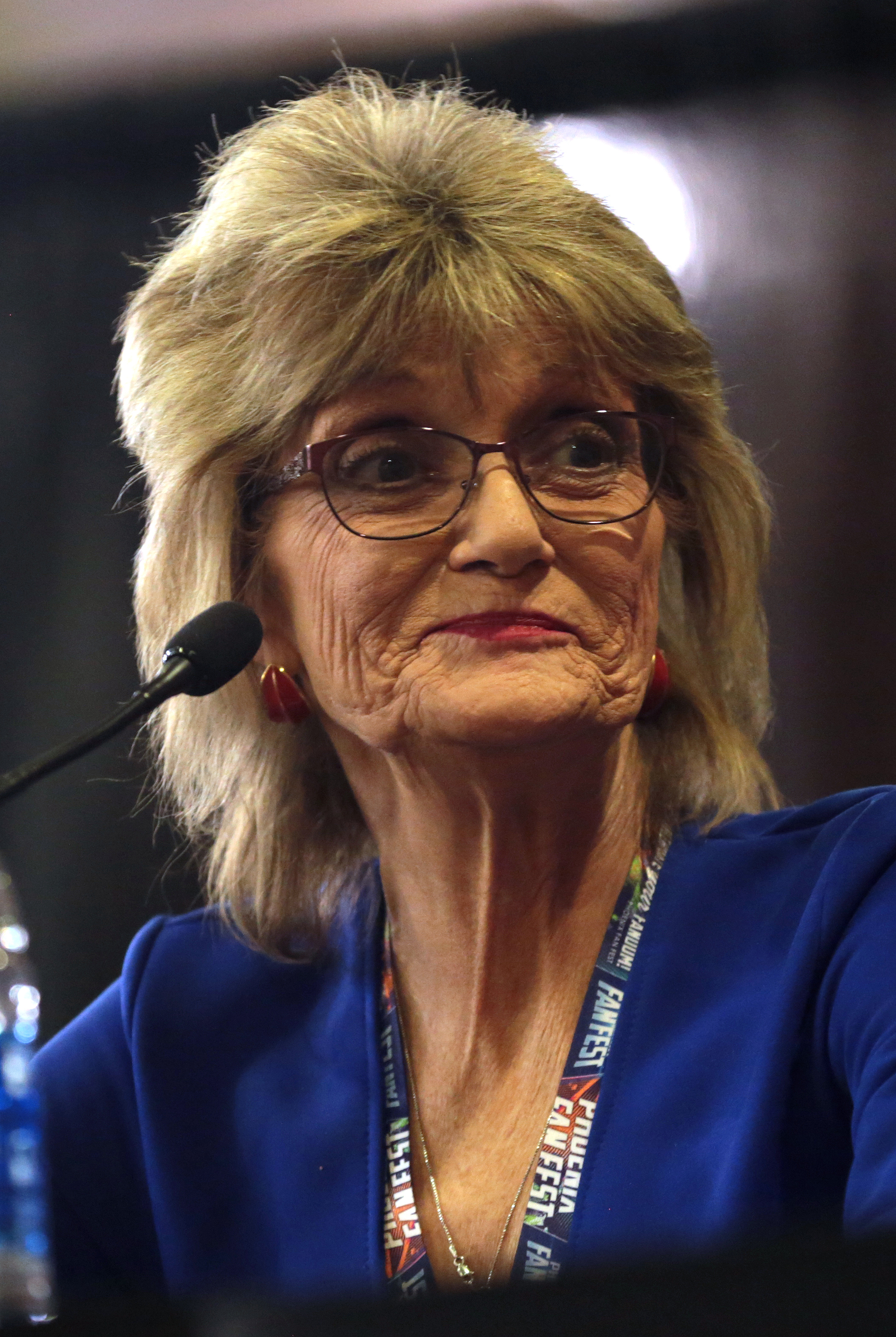
Denise Nickerson

- April 1 – Denise Nickerson, actress (d. 2019)
- April 8 – Fred Smerlas, American football player and radio host
- April 11
- April 11
  - Michael Card, Christian musician
  - Jim Lauderdale, bluegrass musician
- April 12
  - Vince Gill, singer and songwriter
  - Adam Parfrey, journalist and editor (d. 2018)
  - Suzzanne Douglas, African-American actress (d. 2021)
- April 14 – Richard Jeni, comedian (d. 2007)
- April 16 – Essex Hemphill, African American poet and gay activist (d. 1995)
- April 17 – Afrika Bambaataa, DJ and producer
- April 18 – Genie, feral child
- April 21 – Jesse Orosco, baseball player
- April 23 – Jan Hooks, actress and comedian (d. 2014)
- April 27 – Robert Curtis Brown, television, film and stage actor
- April 29 – Timothy Treadwell, environmentalist and filmmaker (d. 2003)

=== May ===
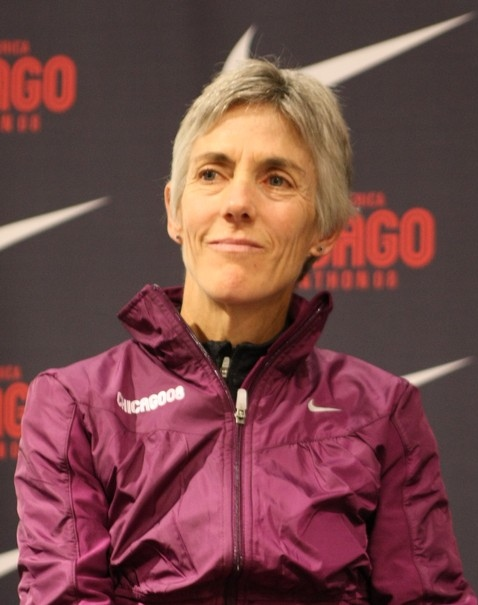
Joan Benoit

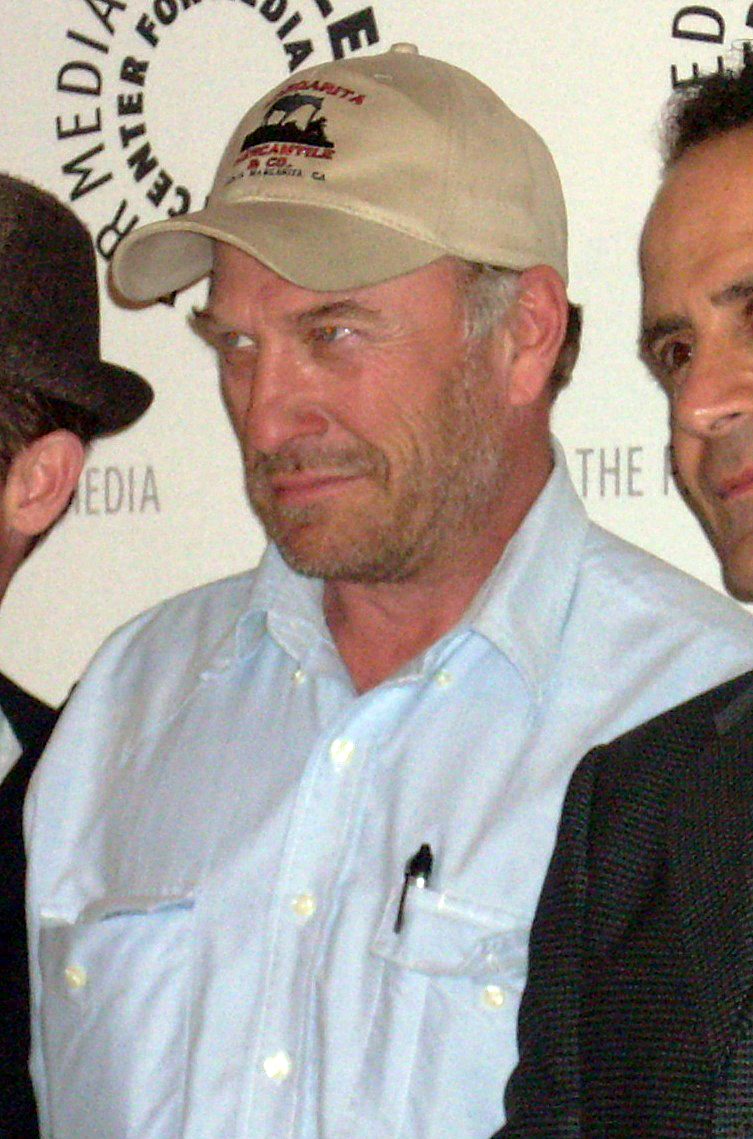
Ted Levine

- May 3 – William Clay Ford Jr., automobile executive
- May 4 – Iona Morris, actress
- May 15 – Kevin Von Erich, professional wrestler
- May 11 – Lynn J. Rothschild, American biologist and astrobiologist
- May 16
  - Joan Benoit, Olympic gold medal-winning marathon runner
  - Bob Suter, professional ice hockey player (d. 2014)
- May 18 – Lionel Shriver, author and journalist
- May 20 – Stewart Nozette, astronomer
- May 21
  - Bruce Buffer, ring announcer
  - Judge Reinhold, actor
- May 24
  - John Harrington, American professional ice hockey player
  - John G. Rowland, American politician, author, and convicted felon
- May 28 – Kirk Gibson, American baseball player
- May 29
  - Bobby Hamilton, stock car racing driver (died 2007)
  - Jeb Hensarling, politician
  - Ted Levine, actor
- May 31 – Jim Craig, professional ice hockey player

=== June ===
Frances McDormand

- June 5 – Charles Nolan, fashion designer (died 2011)
- June 6 – Jessica Diamond, artist
- June 8 – Scott Adams, cartoonist (Dilbert) (died 2026)
- June 12 – Timothy Busfield, American actor
- June 14
  - Suzanne Nora Johnson, lawyer and businesswoman
  - Mona Simpson, novelist
- June 21 – Michael Bowen, American actor
- June 23 – Frances McDormand, American actress
- June 24 – Doug Jones, American baseball player (died 2021)

=== July ===
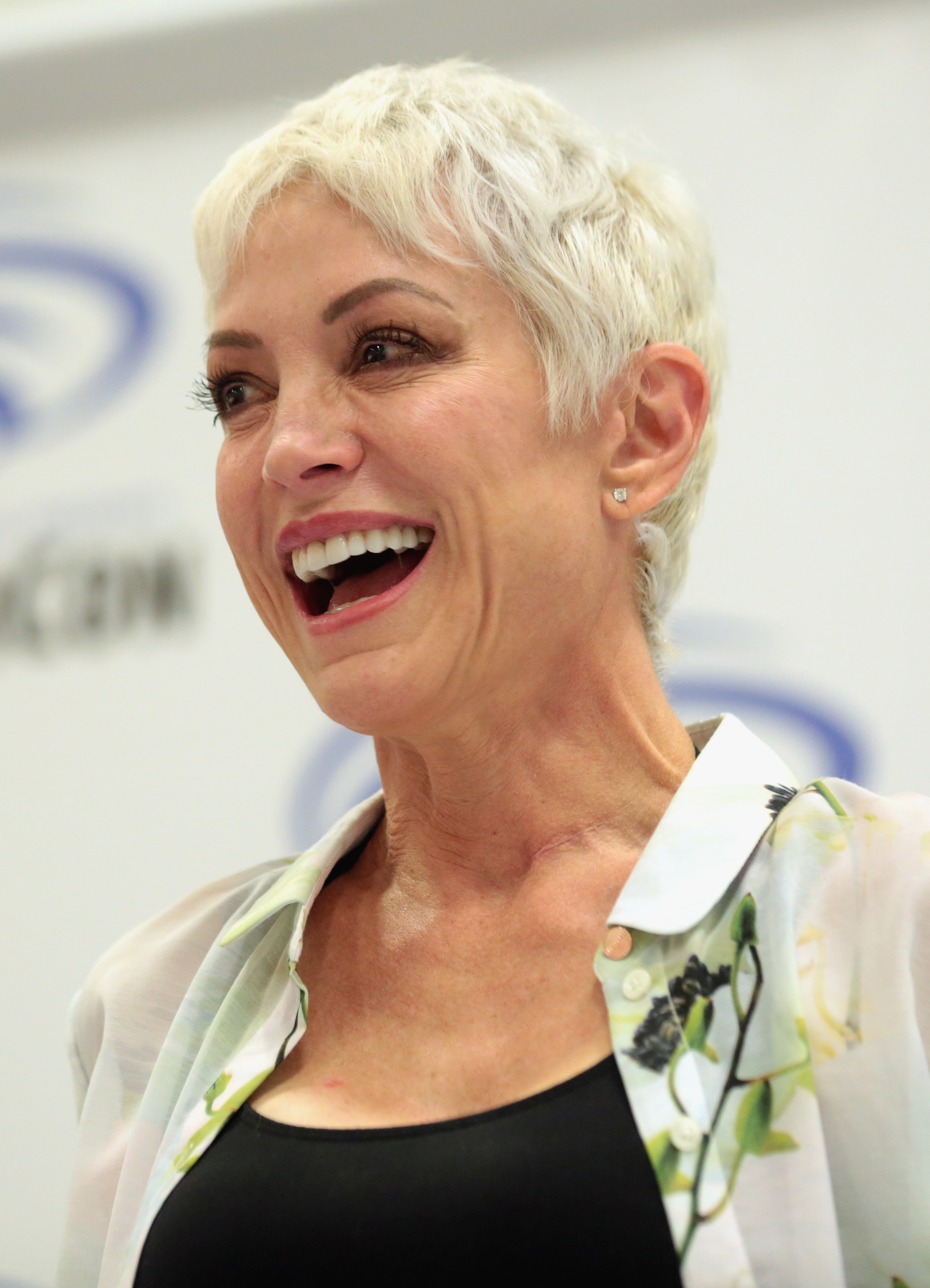
Nana Visitor

- July 3
  - Shan Goshorn, American Cherokee artist (d. 2018)
  - Ken Ober, American actor and game show host (d. 2009)
  - Faye Resnick, American TV personality
- July 8 – James E. Malone Jr., American politician (d. 2024)
- July 9 – Kelly McGillis, American actress
- July 10 – Cindy Sheehan, American anti-war activist
- July 12
  - Buddy Foster, American actor
  - Rick Husband, American astronaut (d. 2003)
- July 13 – Cameron Crowe, American writer and film director
- July 15 – Cecile Richards, American women's rights activist (d. 2025)
- July 16 – Faye Grant, American actress
- July 21 – Jon Lovitz, actor and comedian
- July 24 – Jack O'Callahan, professional ice hockey player
- July 26 – Nana Visitor, actress
- July 27 – Matt Osborne, professional wrestler (d. 2013)
- July 31 – Paul Provenza, comedian

=== August ===
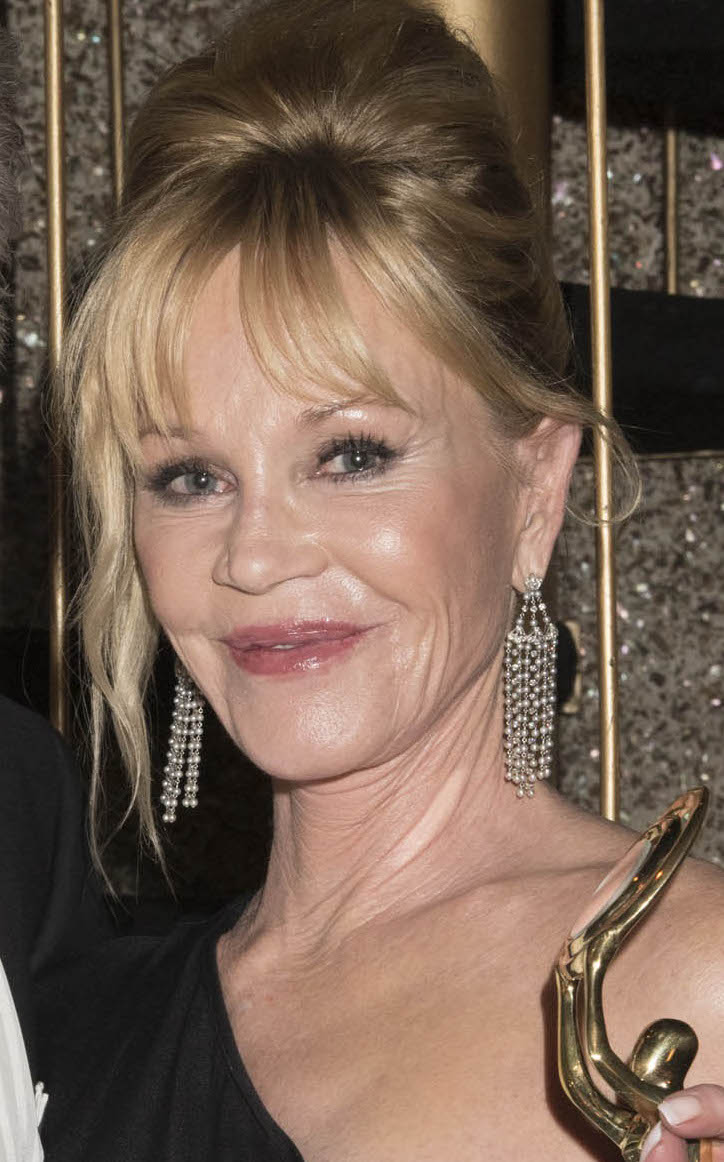
Melanie Griffith

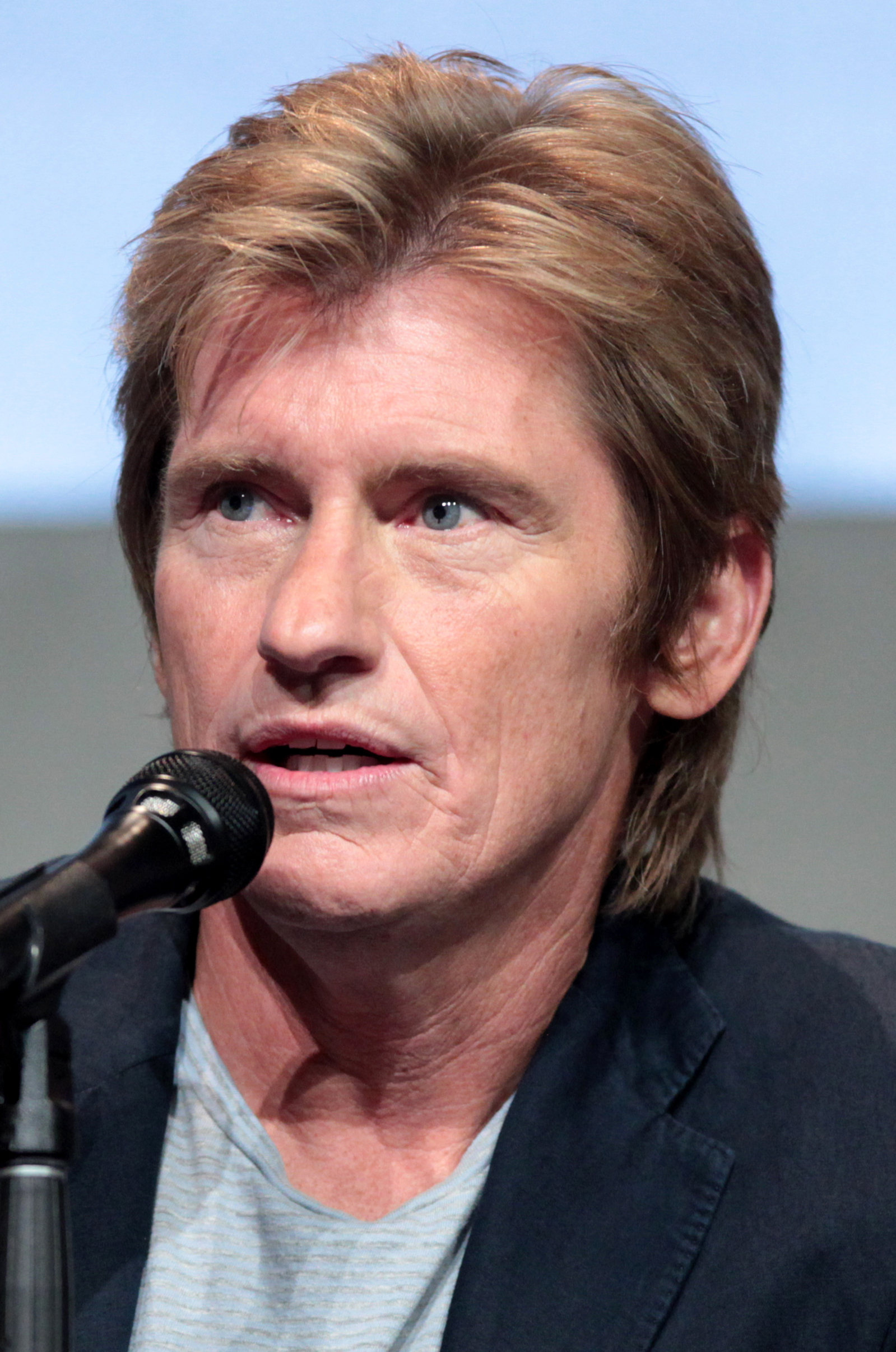
Denis Leary

- August 1 – Taylor Negron, actor (d. 2015)
- August 2 – Mojo Nixon, singer, lyricist and actor (d. 2024)
- August 5 – Clayton Rohner, actor
- August 6 – Jim McGreevey, 52nd Governor of New Jersey
- August 9 – Melanie Griffith, American actress
- August 14 – Tony Moran, American actor and producer
- August 16
  - Laura Innes, American actress and director
  - Phil Murphy, American politician
- August 18 – Denis Leary, comedian and actor
- August 19 – Martin Donovan, actor
- August 22 – Holly Dunn, country music singer and songwriter (d. 2016)
- August 24 – Kristina Gjerde, American oceanographer (d. 2025)
- August 28
  - Rick Rossovich, American actor
  - Daniel Stern, American actor
- August 30 – Manu Tuiasosopo, American football player
- August 31 – Gina Schock, American drummer (The Go-Go's)

=== September ===
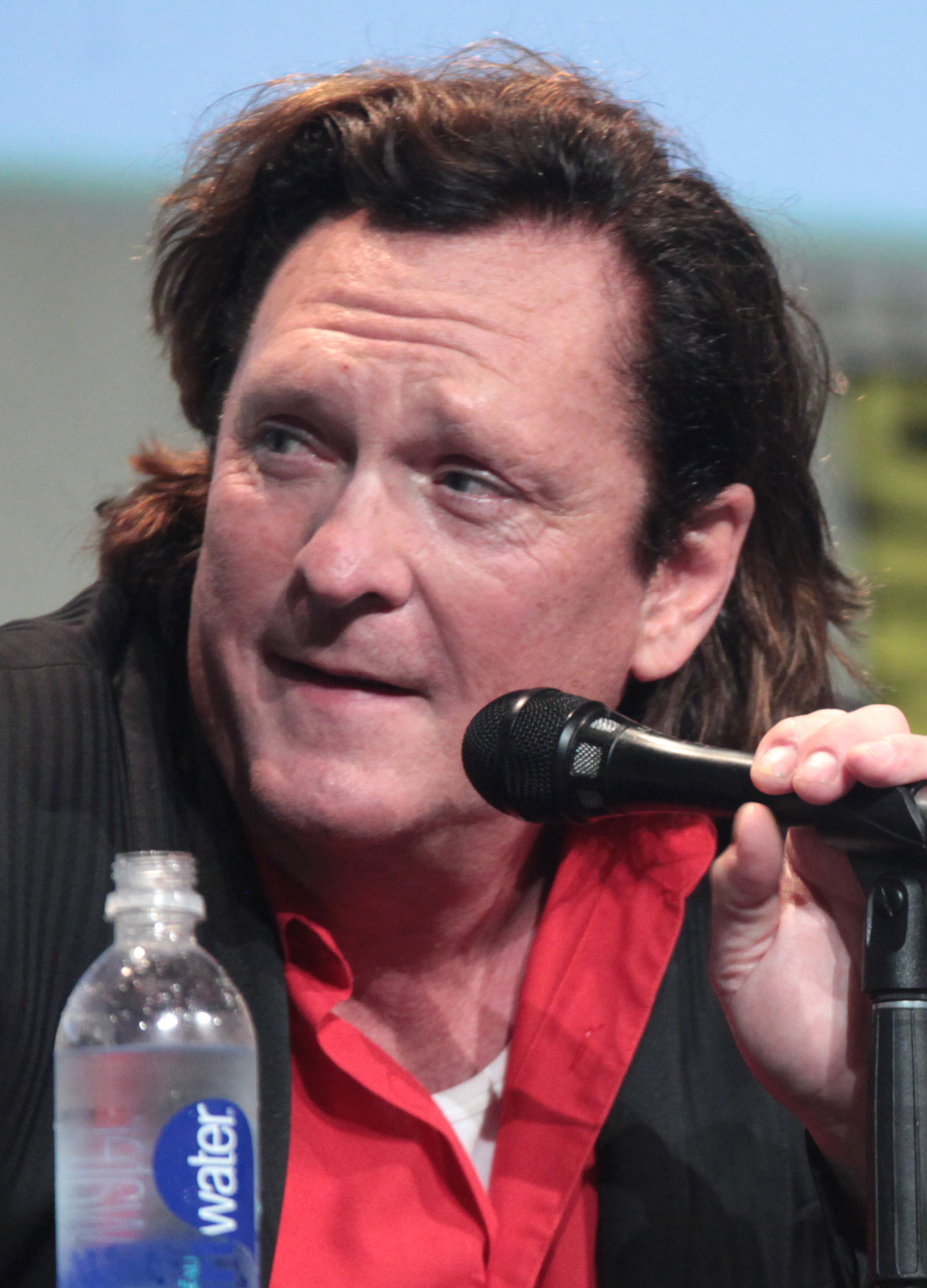
Michael Madsen

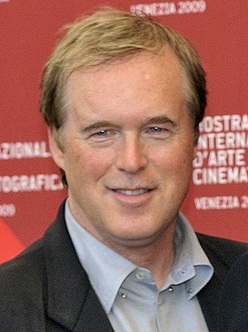
Brad Bird

- September 3 – Earl Cureton, American basketball player (d. 2024)
- September 8 – Heather Thomas, American actress and activist
- September 11
  - Jeff Sluman, American golfer
  - Jeh Johnson, American politician, 4th Secretary of Homeland Security
- September 13 – Vinny Appice, drummer
- September 15 – Brad Bird, American animator and director
- September 18 – Mark Wells, American professional ice hockey player (d. 2024)
- September 21 – Ethan Coen, American film director, producer, screenwriter and editor
- September 22
  - Mark Johnson, American professional ice hockey player and coach
  - Ted Williams, announcer, radio personality, and voice-over artist
- September 24 – Brad Bird, American director, screenwriter, animator, producer and actor
- September 27 – Peter Sellars, theatre director
- September 28 – Bill Cassidy, Senator from Louisiana, physician and politician
- September 29 – Andrew Dice Clay, American comedian
- September 30 – Fran Drescher, American actress

=== October ===
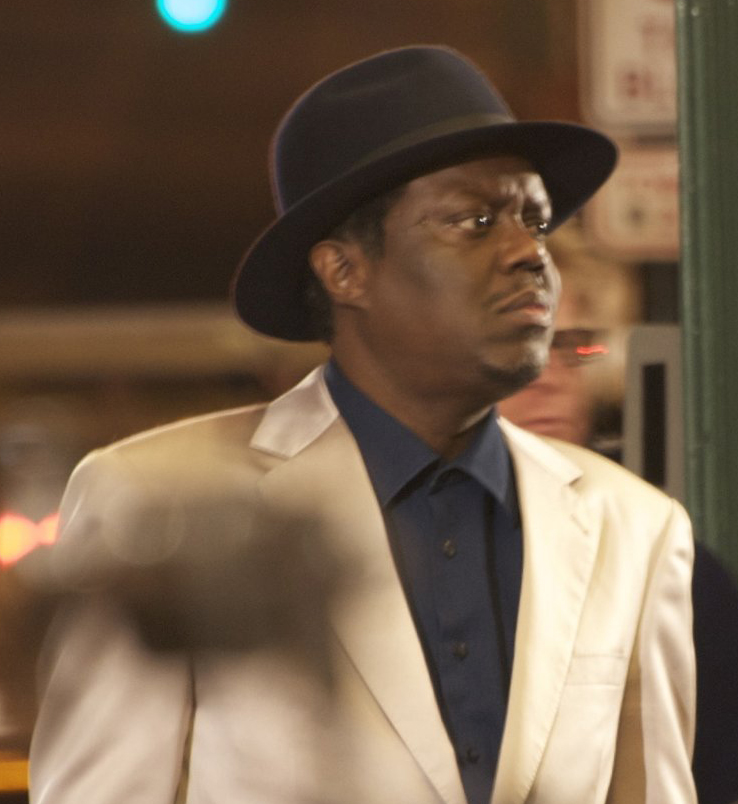
Bernie Mac

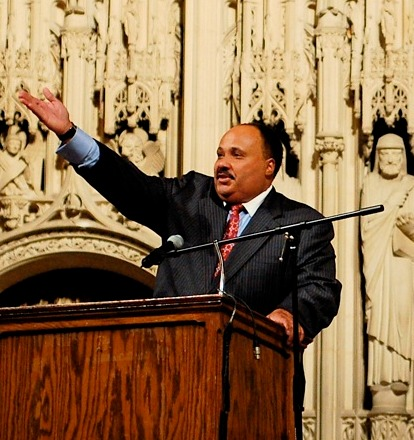
Martin Luther King III

- October 4 – Bill Fagerbakke, American voice actor
- October 5 – Bernie Mac, African-American comedian and actor (d. 2008)
- October 7
  - Marcus Lamb, American televangelist (d. 2021)
  - Michael W. Smith, American Christian musician
- October 12 – Renee Chenault-Fattah, journalist
- October 14
  - Kenny Neal, guitarist
  - Greg Tate, writer and musician (d. 2021)
- October 15 – Stacy Peralta, American director and skateboarder
- October 16 – Jim Hodges, American installation artist
- October 18 – Gary Gensler, American banker
- October 21 – Steve Lukather, American musician
- October 23 – Martin Luther King III, African-American human rights advocate and community activist
- October 24 – John Kassir, American actor and comedian
- October 25 – Nancy Cartwright, actress
- October 26 – Bob Golic, American football player
- October 29 – Dan Castellaneta, American actor
- October 30 – Kevin Pollak, American actor
- October 31
  - Lauren Berlant, American cultural theorist (d. 2021)
  - Brian Stokes Mitchell, American actor and singer
  - Shirley Phelps-Roper, American political and religious activist
  - Robert Pollard, American musician

=== November ===
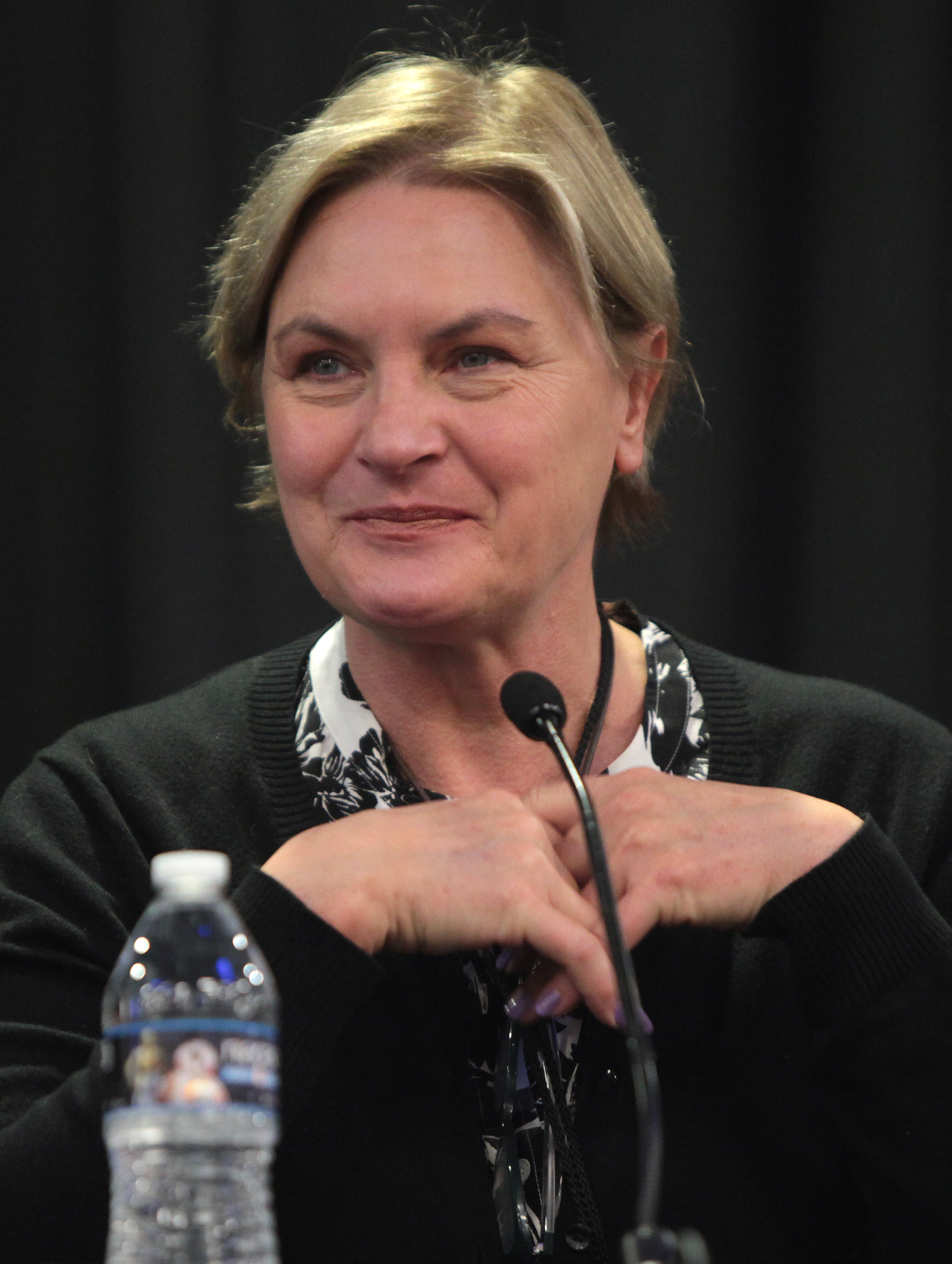
Denise Crosby

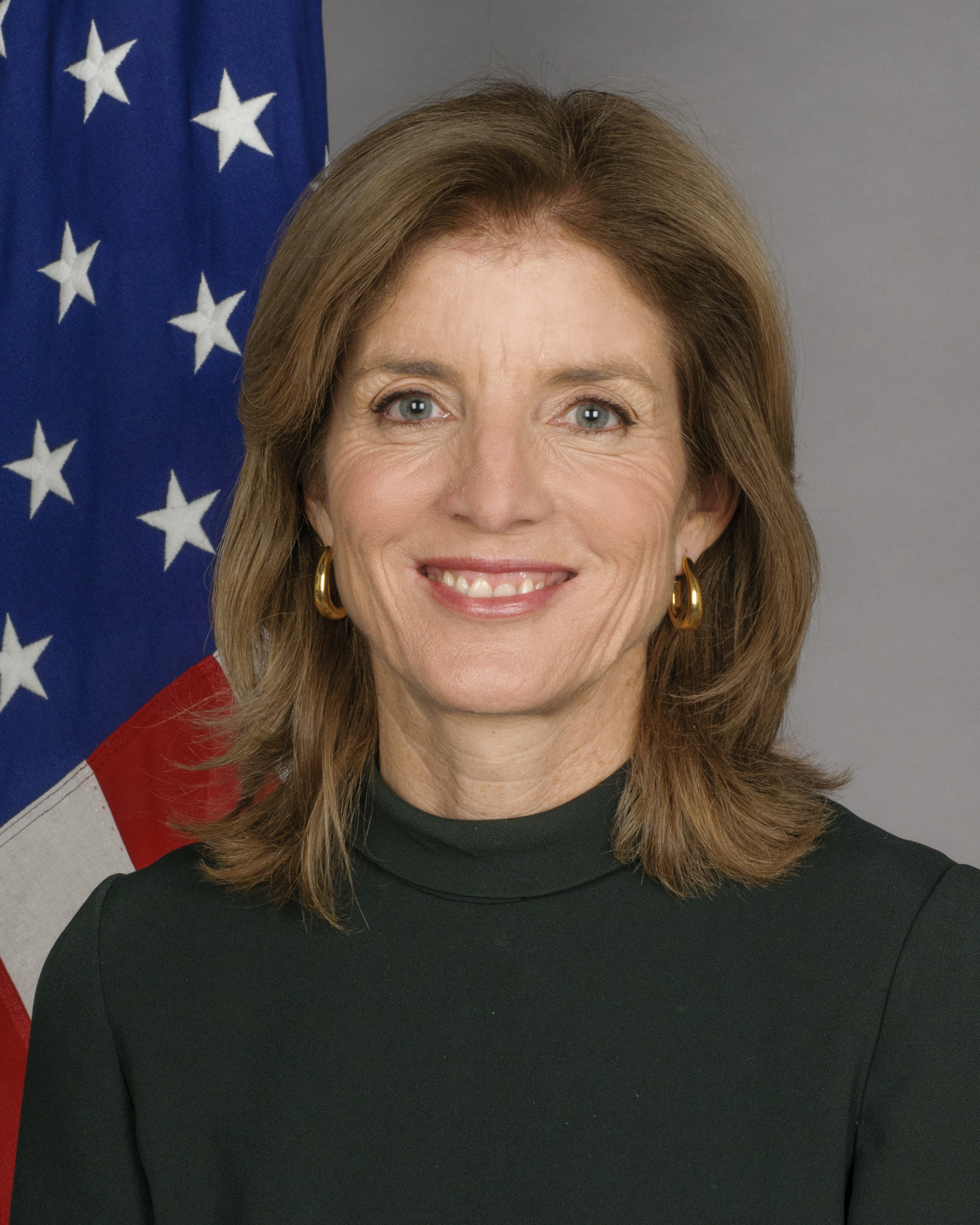
Caroline Kennedy

- November 1 – Peter Ostrum, American child actor and veterinarian
- November 5 – Jon-Erik Hexum, American actor (d. 1984)
- November 6
  - Cam Clarke, American actor and singer
  - Lori Singer, American actress and musician
- November 7 – Christopher Knight, American actor
- November 9 – Eric Sievers, American football player (d. 2024)
- November 10 – George Lowe, American voice actor and comedian (d. 2025)
- November 12 – Brad Sigmon, American convicted murderer (d. 2025)
- November 13
  - Greg Abbott, American politician
  - Roger Ingram, American jazz musician, author, educator, trumpet designer
- November 14 – Gregg Burge, American tap dancer and choreographer (d. 1998)
- November 15 – Kevin Eubanks, American jazz guitarist
- November 19 – Tom Virtue, American actor
- November 22 – Don Newman, American basketball player and coach (d. 2018)
- November 23 – William Kaelin Jr., American cellular biologist, recipient of Nobel Prize in Physiology or Medicine in 2019
- November 24 – Denise Crosby, American actress
- November 26 – Kevin Kamenetz, American politician (d. 2018)
- November 27 – Caroline Kennedy, American author and attorney

=== December ===
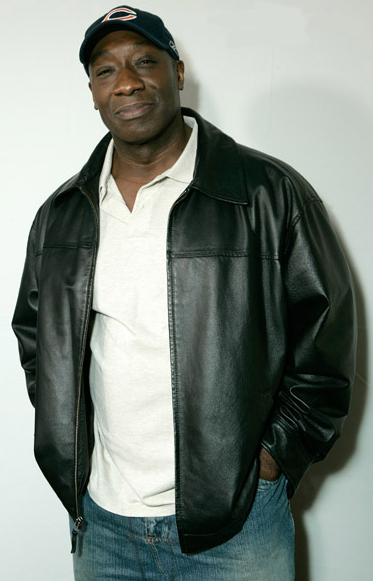
Michael Clarke Duncan

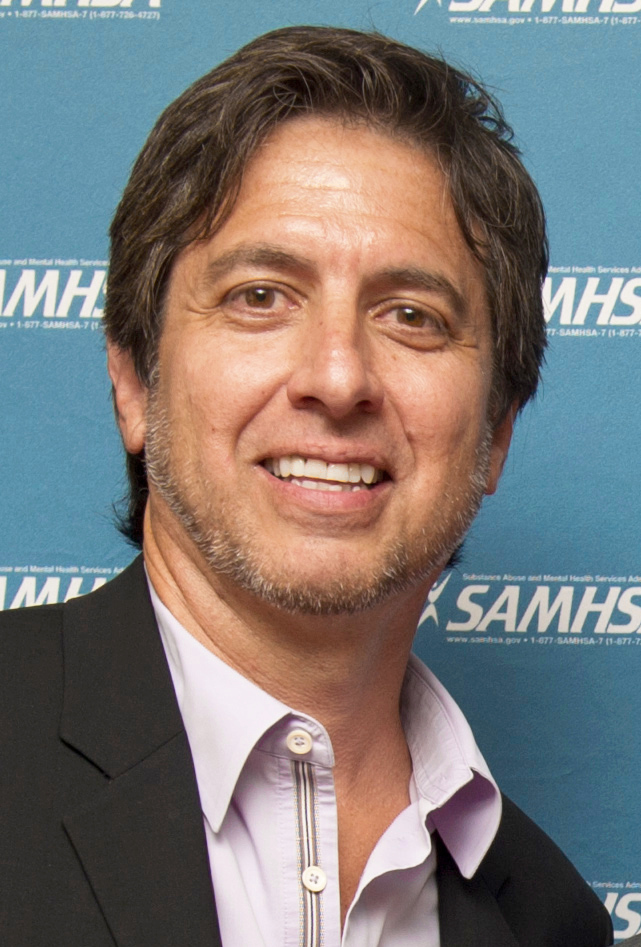
Ray Romano

- December 1 – Vesta Williams, American singer-songwriter (d. 2011)
- December 4 – Eric S. Raymond, American open source software advocate
- December 6
  - Tom Brinkman, American politician
  - Andrew Cuomo, American politician, 56th Governor of New York
  - Dana Sue Gray, American serial killer
- December 9 – Donny Osmond, American pop singer
- December 10 – Michael Clarke Duncan, African-American actor (d. 2012)
- December 12 – Sheila E., American percussionist, singer, author, and actress
- December 13 – Steve Buscemi, American actor and comedian
- December 14 – Tim Cone, American professional basketball coach in the Philippines
- December 15 – Laura Molina, American artist, musician and actress
- December 19 – Kevin McHale, American basketball player
- December 20 – Joyce Hyser, American actress
- December 21
  - John Geddert, American gymnastic coach (d. 2021)
  - Tom Henke, American baseball player
  - Ray Romano, American actor and comedian
- December 23 – Steve Silberman, American writer and editor (d. 2024)
- December 27 – Greg Mortenson, American humanitarian and author
- December 29 – Bruce Beutler, American immunologist and geneticist
- December 30 – Matt Lauer, American newscaster

== Deaths ==
- January 14 – Humphrey Bogart, film actor (born 1899)
- January 16 – Arturo Toscanini, Italian-born orchestral conductor (born 1867)
- January 26
  - Helene Costello, actress (born 1906)
  - William Eythe, actor (born 1918)
  - Enoch J. Rector, cinema technician, inventor, and film director (born 1863)
- February 2
  - Marian Cruger Coffin, landscape architect (born 1876)
  - Julia Morgan, architect and engineer (born 1872)
- February 5 – Ben Hardaway, film director (born 1895)
- February 10 – Laura Ingalls Wilder, author (born 1867)
- February 16 – William M. Acton, lawyer and politician (born 1876)
- February 25
  - Bugs Moran, gangster (born 1893)
  - B. P. Schulberg, film producer (born 1892)
- March 11 – Richard E. Byrd, explorer (born 1888)
- March 12 – Josephine Hull, actress (born 1877)
- March 29 – Laura Bowman, actress and singer (born 1881)
- March 31 – Gene Lockhart, Canadian-American actor (born 1891)
- April 3 – Ned Sparks, Canadian-born actor (born 1883)
- April 8 – Dorothy Sebastian, actress (born 1903)
- May 1 – Grant Mitchell, actor (born 1874)
- May 2 – Joseph McCarthy, U.S. Senator from 1947 to 1957 (born 1908)
- May 10 – Annie Turnbo Malone, African American millionaire businesswoman, inventor and philanthropist (born 1869)
- May 13 – Robert Alfred Theobald, admiral (born 1884)
- May 16 – Eliot Ness, Prohibition agent (born 1903)
- May 29 – James Whale, English director and actor (born 1889)
- June 1 – Russell Hicks, actor (born 1895)
- June 4 – Mary Hay, actress and dancer (born 1901)
- June 12 – Jimmy Dorsey, big band leader (born 1904)
- June 13 – Bruno Albert Forsterer, Marine Sergeant, Medal of Honor recipient (born 1869)
- June 15 – Norina Matchabelli, actress (born 1880)
- July 3 – Judy Tyler, actress (b. 1932)
- July 8 – Grace Coolidge, First Lady of the United States, Second Lady of the United States (born 1879)
- July 10 – Julia Boynton Green, poet (born 1861)
- July 15 – George Cleveland, Canadian-American actor (born 1885)
- July 24 – Frank Fenton, actor (born 1906)
- August 7 – Oliver Hardy, comic film actor (born 1892)
- September 2 – Bobby Myers, race car driver (killed in racetrack accident) (born 1927)
- September 21
  - Margaret Ashmore Sudduth, educator, editor and temperance advocate (born 1859)
  - Henry E. Warren, inventor (born 1872)
- October 13 – Erich Auerbach, German philologist, literary critic and comparative scholar (born 1892)
- October 25 – Albert Anastasia, Italian American gangster (born 1902)
- October 29 – Louis B. Mayer, Belarusian-born film studio head (born 1885)
- November 1 – Charlie Caldwell, sports player and coach (born 1901)
- November 17 – Cora Witherspoon, actress (born 1890)
- November 29 – Erich Korngold, Austrian-born composer (born 1897)
- December 2 – Harrison Ford, silent film actor (b. 1884)
- December 10 – Maurice McLoughlin, tennis player (born 1890)
- December 24 – Norma Talmadge, silent film actress (born 1894)
- December 28 – Hilda Vaughn, actress (born 1898)

== See also ==
- List of American films of 1957
- Timeline of United States history (1950–1969)
