= Florenciella =

Florenciella may refer to:

- Florenciella (alga), a genus of algae in the class Dictyochophyceae
- Florenciella (fish), a genus of fishes in the family Epigonidae
