= Epigonus affinis =

Conservation status
- Least Concern (IUCN 3.1)

Scientific classification
- Kingdom: Animalia
- Phylum: Chordata
- Class: Actinopterygii
- Order: Acropomatiformes
- Family: Epigonidae
- Genus: Epigonus
- Species: E. affinis

Binomial name
- Epigonus affinis Parin & Abramov, 1986

Species of ray-finned fish

Epigonus affinis, the smooth-nose deepwater cardinalfish, is a species of deepwater cardinalfish found in the eastern-central Atlantic Ocean. This fish occurs at depths of 300 m (980 ft).

== Size ==
This species reaches a length of 14.5 cm (5.7 in).

== Etymology ==
The fish name means related to, referring to the similarity with Epigonus elegans
