= Epigonus elongatus =

Scientific classification
- Domain: Eukaryota
- Kingdom: Animalia
- Phylum: Chordata
- Class: Actinopterygii
- Order: Acropomatiformes
- Family: Epigonidae
- Genus: Epigonus
- Species: E. elongatus

Binomial name
- Epigonus elongatus Parin & Abramov, 1986

Species of ray-finned fish

Epigonus elongatus is a species of deepwater cardinalfish found in the Western Indian Ocean mainly north of Madagascar and quite near the Seychelles. This fish occurs at depths of 300 m (980 ft).

== Size ==
This species reaches a length of 16.0 cm (6.3 in).

== Etymology ==
The fish name means referring to its elongate body.
