= E. robustus =

E. robustus may refer to:

- Epigonus robustus, the robust cardinalfish, a deepwater fish species
- Eremurus robustus, a plant species native to the Tien Shan and Pamir Mountains in central Asia
- Eschrichtius robustus, the gray (or grey) whale, a baleen whale species
- Eudyptes robustus, the Snares penguin, Snares crested penguin or Snares Islands penguin, a penguin species from New Zealand
