= R. robusta =

R. robusta may refer to:

- Rhodospatha robusta, a plant species endemic to Ecuador
- Rosenblattia robusta, a deepwater cardinalfish species

== See also ==
- Robusta
