= Microichthys grandis =

Scientific classification
- Kingdom: Animalia
- Phylum: Chordata
- Class: Actinopterygii
- Order: Acropomatiformes
- Family: Epigonidae
- Genus: Microichthys
- Species: M. grandis

Binomial name
- Microichthys grandis Fricke & Couperus, 2023

Species of fish

Microichthys grandis is a species of deep-water cardinalfish native to the Northeastern Atlantic Ocean, off southwest coast of Ireland, where it was described. It is the largest species of the genus Microichthys known, measuring 54.5 mm.
