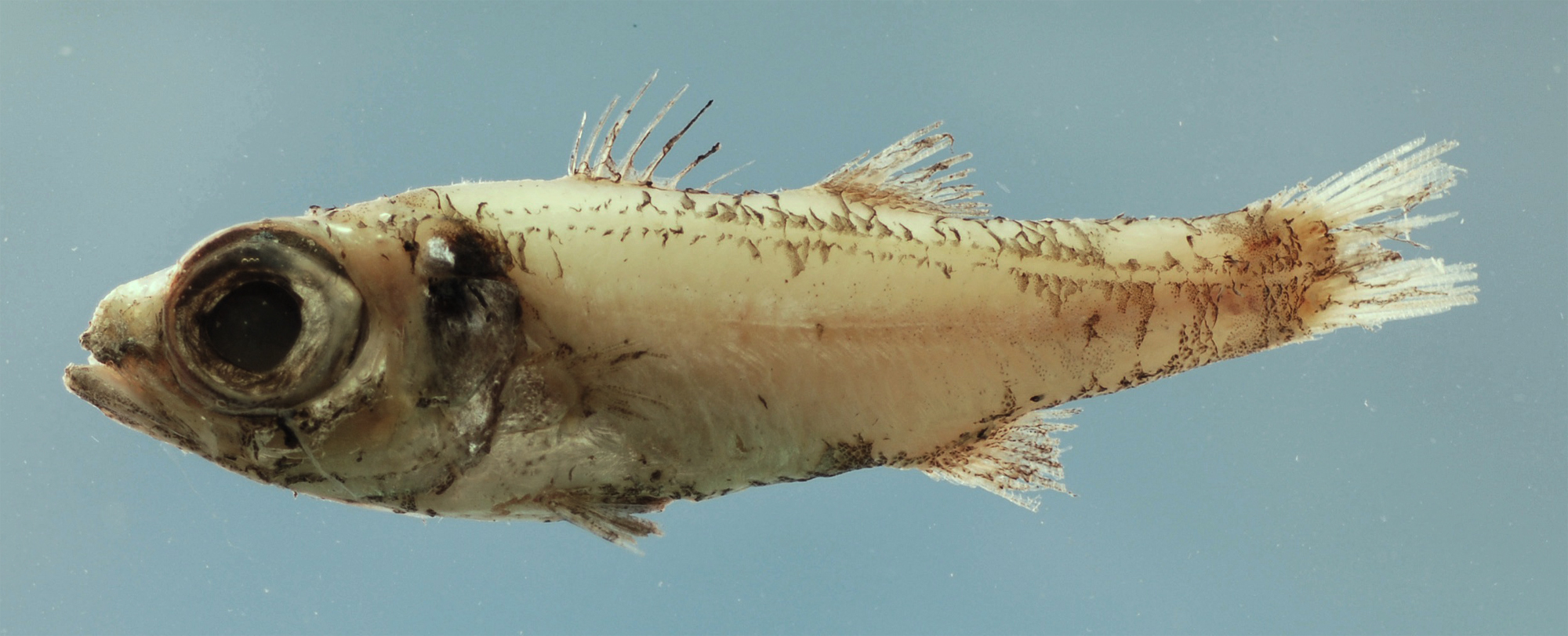

Scientific classification
- Domain: Eukaryota
- Kingdom: Animalia
- Phylum: Chordata
- Class: Actinopterygii
- Order: Acropomatiformes
- Family: Epigonidae
- Genus: Epigonus
- Species: E. robustus

Binomial name
- Epigonus robustus (Barnard, 1927)

Synonyms
- Parahynnodus robustus Barnard, 1927; Hynnodus robustus (Barnard, 1927)

= Robust cardinalfish =

Species of ray-finned fish

The robust cardinalfish (Epigonus robustus) is a species of deepwater cardinalfish found around the world in southern temperate waters at depths of from 500 to 3,000 metres (1,600 to 9,800 ft). It can reach a length of 22 centimetres (8.7 in) TL.

It is a vigorous fish which, apart from the second dorsal fin exhibiting a longer spine, resembles the big-eyed cardinalfish.
