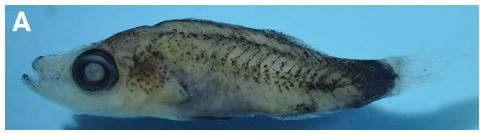

Scientific classification
- Kingdom: Animalia
- Phylum: Chordata
- Class: Actinopterygii
- Order: Acropomatiformes
- Family: Epigonidae
- Genus: Microichthys; Rüppell, 1852

Type species
- Microichthys coccoi Rüppell, 1852

= Microichthys =

Genus of fishes

Microichthys is a genus of very small deepwater cardinalfishes which were only known from the Strait of Messina in the Mediterranean Sea, although M. coccoi has recently been recorded in the Aegean Sea and around the Azores.

== Species ==
The currently recognized species in this genus are:

- Microichthys atlanticus Fricke, Ordines, Williston, 2020
- Microichthys coccoi Rüppell, 1852
- Microichthys grandis Wageningen Marine Research, 2023 (great deepwater cardinalfish)
- Microichthys sanzoi Spartà, 1950
