= Brephostoma =

Scientific classification
- Kingdom: Animalia
- Phylum: Chordata
- Class: Actinopterygii
- Order: Acropomatiformes
- Family: Epigonidae
- Genus: Brephostoma; Alcock, 1889
- Species: B. carpenteri

Binomial name
- Brephostoma carpenteri Alcock, 1889

Synonyms
- Brinkmannella elongata Parr, 1933

Species of ray-finned fish

Brephostoma carpenteri is a species of ray-finned fish in the family Epigonidae, the deepwater cardinalfishes. It occurs in the Pacific Ocean around Papua New Guinea and Hawaii, where it can be found at depths from 500 to 3,782 m (1,640 to 12,408 ft). This species is the only known member of its genus.

The species name honors Alfred Carpenter RN DSO (father of Vice-Admiral Alfred Francis Blakeney Carpenter, VC), who was in command of the ship carrying out the marine survey during which the type specimen was collected.
