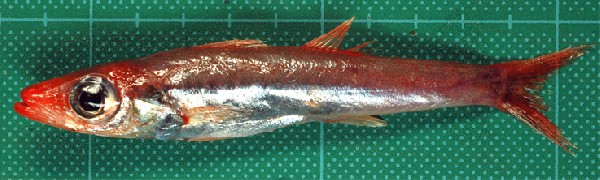

Conservation status
- Least Concern (IUCN 3.1)

Scientific classification
- Kingdom: Animalia
- Phylum: Chordata
- Class: Actinopterygii
- Order: Acropomatiformes
- Family: Epigonidae
- Genus: Sphyraenops; T. N. Gill, 1860
- Species: S. bairdianus

Binomial name
- Sphyraenops bairdianus Poey, 1861

Synonyms
- Scombrosphyraena oceanica Fourmanoir, 1970

= Triplespine deepwater cardinalfish =

Species of fish

The triplespine deepwater cardinalfish (Sphyraenops bairdianus) is a species of deepwater cardinalfish of probably cosmopolitan distribution at depths from 200 to 1,750 m (660 to 5,740 ft). This species is the only known member of its genus.
