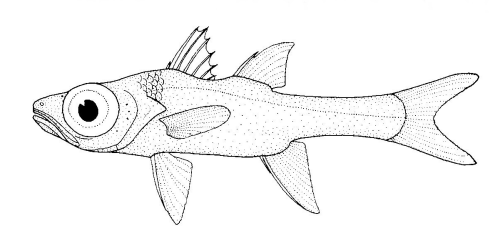
- Drawing by Dr Tony Ayling

Scientific classification
- Domain: Eukaryota
- Kingdom: Animalia
- Phylum: Chordata
- Class: Actinopterygii
- Order: Acropomatiformes
- Family: Epigonidae
- Genus: Epigonus
- Species: E. lenimen

Binomial name
- Epigonus lenimen (Whitley, 1935)

Synonyms
- Scepterias lenimen Whitley, 1935

= Big-eyed cardinalfish =

Species of ray-finned fish

The big-eyed cardinalfish or bigeye cardinalfish (Epigonus lenimen) is a species of deepwater cardinalfish found in the southern Indian Ocean and southwestern Pacific Ocean from south of Madagascar to New Zealand. This fish occurs at depths from 530 to 820 m (1,740 to 2,690 ft). This species can reach 21 centimetres (8.3 in) in total length.
