= Pseudochattonella =

Scientific classification
- Domain: Eukaryota
- Clade: Diaphoretickes
- Clade: SAR
- Clade: Stramenopiles
- Phylum: Gyrista
- Subphylum: Ochrophytina
- Class: Dictyochophyceae
- Order: Florenciellales
- Genus: Pseudochattonella (Y.Hara & Chihara) Tanabe-Hosoi, Honda, Fukaya, Inagaki et Sako

Genus of single-celled organisms

Pseudochattonella is a genus of marine, heterokont flagellates belonging to the class of Dictyochophyceae. It currently comprises two species: Pseudochattonella verruculosa and Pseudochattonella farcimen
