= Caloosahatchee Seamount =

Seamount in the northern Atlantic Ocean in the Corner Rise Seamounts

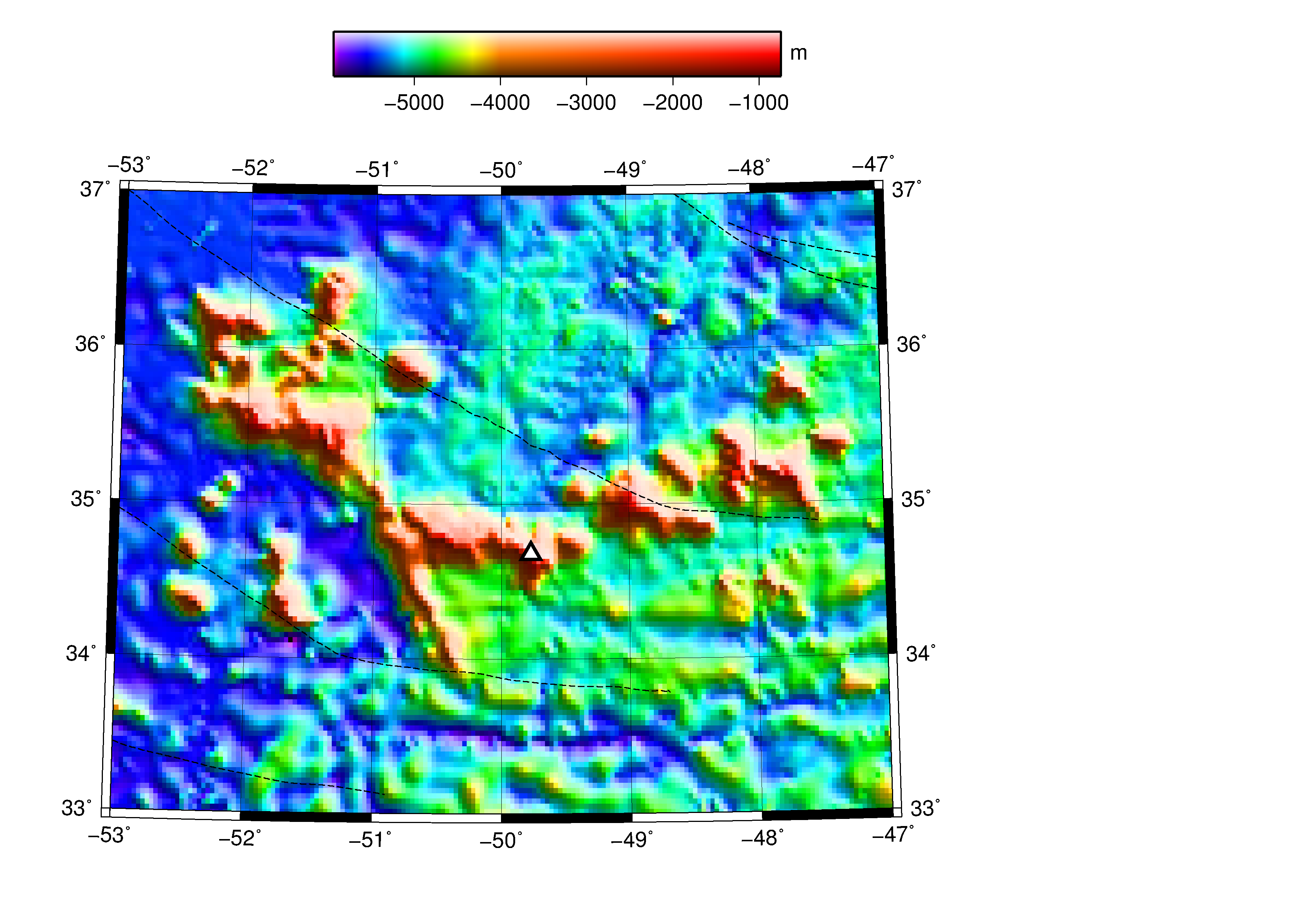
- Caloosahatchee Seamount in the Corner Rise Seamount group
- Caloosahatchee Seamount in the Corner Rise Seamount group

Location
- Location: North Atlantic Ocean
- Coordinates: 34°40′48″N 49°46′12″W

Geology
- Volcanic arc/chain: Corner Rise Seamounts

The Caloosahatchee Seamount is a seamount in the northern Atlantic Ocean. It is part of the Corner Rise Seamounts, which was active about 75 million years ago. It was formed when the North American Plate moved over the New England hotspot, also known as the Great Meteor Hotspot. The Great Meteor Hotspot also formed various kimberlite fields in Canada, the Monteregian Hills, the White Mountains, the New England Seamounts, and the Seewarte Seamounts, which are the newest volcanoes produced by the New England Hotspot.
