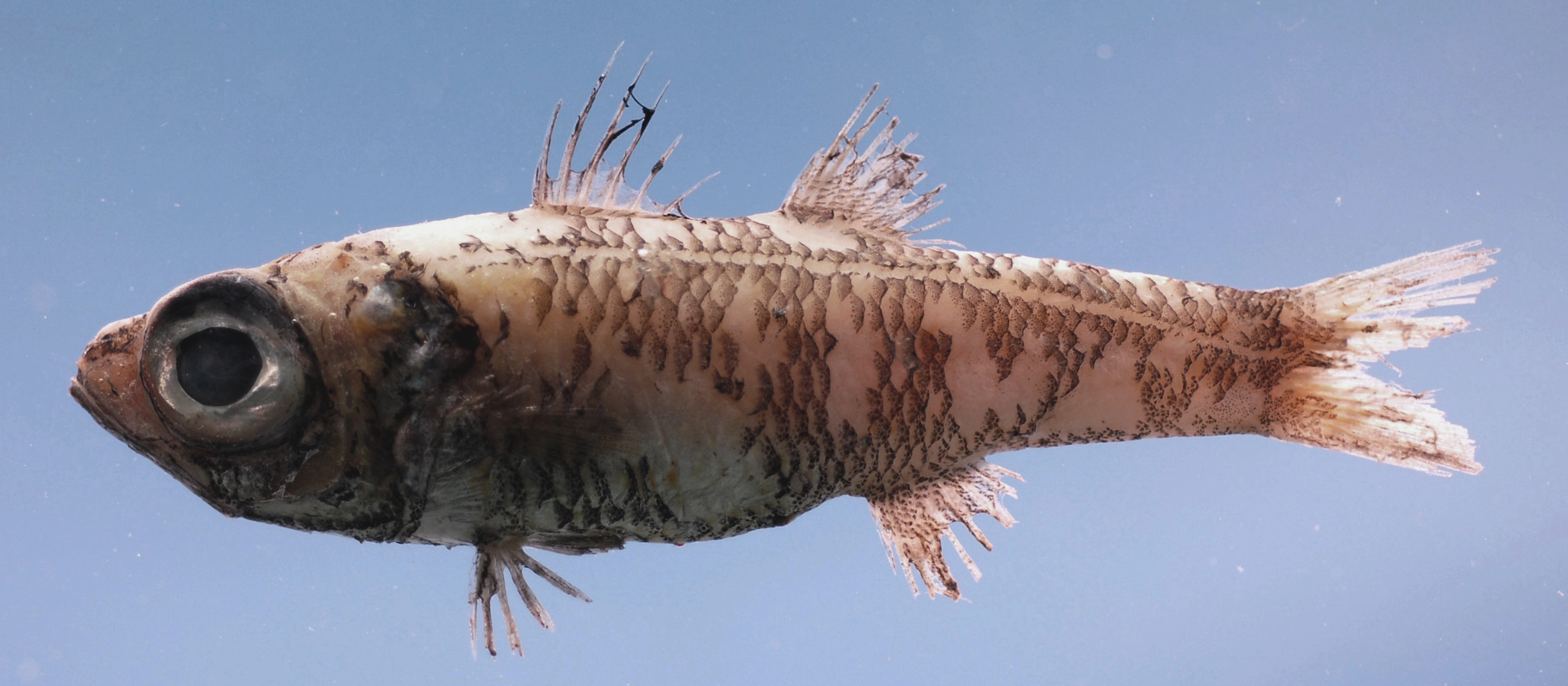
- Epigiaonus denticulatus

Scientific classification
- Kingdom: Animalia
- Phylum: Chordata
- Class: Actinopterygii
- Division: Teleostei
- Order: Acropomatiformes
- Family: Epigonidae
- Genus: Epigonus; Rafinesque, 1810

Type species
- Epigonus macrophthalmus Rafinesque, 1810

= Epigonus (fish) =

Genus of ray-finned fishes

Epigonus is a genus of ray-finned fish in the family Epigonidae found in the Atlantic, Indian and Pacific Ocean. The genus was erected by Constantine Samuel Rafinesque in 1810.

== Species ==
There are currently 37 recognized species in this genus:

- Epigonus affinis Parin & Abramov, 1986 (smooth-nose deep-water cardinalfish)
- Epigonus angustifrons Abramov & Manilo, 1987
- Epigonus atherinoides (C. H. Gilbert, 1905)
- Epigonus carbonarius Okamoto & Motomura, 2011 (charcoal deep-water cardinalfish)
- Epigonus cavaticus H. Ida, Okamoto & Sakaue, 2007 (Palauan deep-water cardinalfish)
- Epigonus chilensis Okamoto, 2012
- Epigonus constanciae (Giglioli, 1880)
- Epigonus crassicaudus F. de Buen, 1959
- Epigonus ctenolepis Mochizuki & Shirakihara, 1983
- Epigonus zonatus Okamoto, Long, Claro & McCosker, 2025
- Epigonus denticulatus Dieuzeide, 1950 (pencil deep-water cardinalfish)
- Epigonus devaneyi Gon, 1985
- Epigonus draco Okamoto, 2015 (dragon deep-water cardinalfish)
- Epigonus elegans Parin & Abramov, 1986
- Epigonus elongatus Parin & Abramov, 1986
- Epigonus exodon Okamoto & Motomura, 2012
- Epigonus fragilis (D. S. Jordan & E. K. Jordan, 1922)
- Epigonus glossodontus Gon, 1985
- Epigonus heracleus Parin & Abramov, 1986 (Hercules deep-water cardinalfish)
- Epigonus indicus IDREES BABU & AKHILESH 2020
- Epigonus lenimen (Whitley, 1935) (big-eyed deep-water cardinalfish)
- Epigonus lifouensis Okamoto & Motomura, 2013 (Loyalty deep-water cardinalfish)
- Epigonus machaera Okamoto, 2012
- Epigonus macrops (A. B. Brauer, 1906) (luminous deep-water cardinalfish)
- Epigonus marimonticolus Parin & Abramov, 1986
- Epigonus marisrubri Krupp, Zajonz & Khalaf, 2009 (Red Sea deep-water cardinalfish)
- Epigonus masamunei Okamoto, 2026
- Epigonus mayeri Okamoto, 2011 (Angolan deep-water cardinalfish)
- Epigonus megalops (H. M. Smith & Radcliffe, 1912)
- Epigonus notacanthus Parin & Abramov, 1986
- Epigonus occidentalis Goode & T. H. Bean, 1896 (western deep-water cardinalfish)
- Epigonus oligolepis G. F. Mayer, 1974
- Epigonus pandionis (Goode & T. H. Bean, 1881)
- Epigonus parini Abramov, 1987
- Epigonus pectinifer G. F. Mayer, 1974
- Epigonus robustus (Barnard, 1927) (robust deep-water cardinalfish)
- Epigonus telescopus (A. Risso, 1810) (black deep-water cardinalfish)
- Epigonus thai Prokofiev & Bussarawit, 2012
- Epigonus tuberculatus Okamoto & Motomura, 2013 (Keeling deep-water cardinalfish)
- Epigonus waltersensis Parin & Abramov, 1986
