= Florenciellales =

Scientific classification
- Domain: Eukaryota
- Clade: Diaphoretickes
- Clade: SAR
- Clade: Stramenopiles
- Phylum: Gyrista
- Subphylum: Ochrophytina
- Class: Dictyochophyceae
- Order: Florenciellales; Eikrem, Edvardsen & Throndsen

Order of single-celled organisms

Florenciellales is an order of Dictyochophyceae.

It includes Pseudochattonella, Florenciella, and Luteocerasus.
