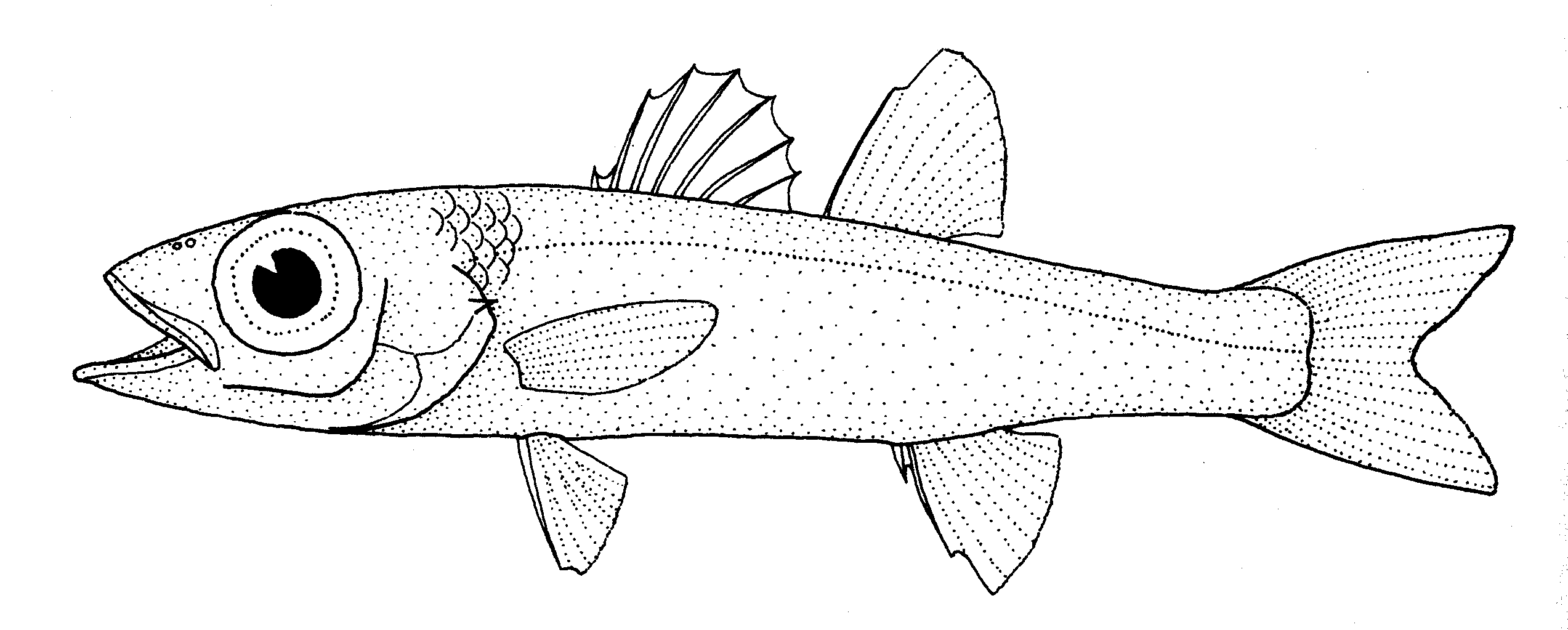
- Drawing by Dr Tony Ayling
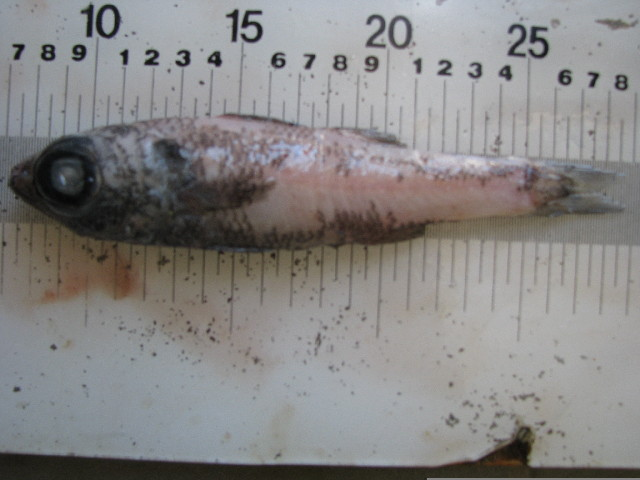

Conservation status
- Least Concern (IUCN 3.1)

Scientific classification
- Kingdom: Animalia
- Phylum: Chordata
- Class: Actinopterygii
- Order: Acropomatiformes
- Family: Epigonidae
- Genus: Epigonus
- Species: E. telescopus

Binomial name
- Epigonus telescopus (A. Risso, 1810)

Synonyms
- Pomatomus telescopus A. Risso, 1810; Epigonus macrophthalmus Rafinesque, 1810; Pomatomus cuvieri Cocco, 1829; Pomatomus cuvierii Cocco, 1829

= Epigonus telescopus =

Species of fish

Epigonus telescopus, the black cardinal fish, is a species of deepwater cardinalfish found in most temperate oceans worldwide, at depths of between 75 and 1,200 metres (246 and 3,937 ft) though mostly between 300 and 800 metres (980 and 2,620 ft). It can reach a length of 75 centimetres (30 in) TL though most specimens do not exceed 55 centimetres (22 in) TL. It has been reported that this species can reach an age of 104 years.

== Description ==
The black cardinal fish is a shallow-bodied fish with large eyes and a blunt snout and slightly projecting lower jaw. The dorsal fin is in two parts and has seven or eight spines and nine to eleven soft rays. The anal fin has two spines and nine soft rays. The general colour of this fish is purplish-brown or black and living specimens are iridescent.

== Distribution and habitat ==
The black cardinal fish is a deepwater bentho-pelagic fish that is found on continental slopes, undersea ridges and seamounts in the northern Atlantic, ranging from Iceland to the Canary Islands and the Corner Rise Seamounts. It is also found in the southeastern Atlantic, including the Walvis Ridge off southwestern Africa, the Indian Ocean and the southwestern Pacific Ocean.

== Fisheries ==
The black cardinal fish is subject to commercial fisheries, primarily around seamounts. Based on the FAO fishery statistics, the annual catches worldwide ranged between 1,355 and 4,353 tonnes in 2000 to 2009, most of the fish being taken from the Southwest Pacific (FAO Fishing Area 81). However, according to Watson et al., the catches peaked at 10,000 tonnes in the year 2000.
