= Kristina Gjerde =

American high seas policy advisor (1957–2025)

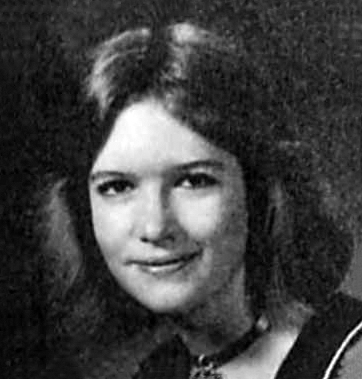
- High school yearbook portrait, 1975
- Born: August 24, 1957; Walnut Creek, California, U.S.
- Died: December 26, 2025 (aged 68); Boston, Massachusetts, U.S.
- Education: University of California, Los Angeles; New York University (JD)
- Occupation: Oceanographer
- Employer: International Union for Conservation of Nature
- Known for: Marine law, ocean conservation

Kristina Maria Gjerde (August 24, 1957 – December 26, 2025) was an American oceanographer, who served as a High Seas Policy Advisor for the International Union for Conservation of Nature Global Marine and Polar Program. A lawyer by trade, Gjerde focused on ocean conservation throughout her career. She worked on the Global Ocean Biodiversity Initiative and won the 2018 Boat International Visionary Ocean Award.

== Education and early career ==
Gjerde was born on August 24, 1957, in Walnut Creek, California. She studied history at University of California, Los Angeles. She graduated summa cum laude in 1981. She moved to the east coast and studied law at New York University, graduating Juris Doctor in 1984. She worked on the use of space technology in conflict prevention as an intern at the United Nations. She specialised in admiralty law at Lord Day & Lord. She was not allowed to join the admiralty law social club, the Whitehall Club, as it did not accept women members. During a scuba diving trip to Palau, Gjerde became interested in protecting the oceans. She was awarded a two-year fellowship at Woods Hole Oceanographic Institution in 1988. She evaluated the international protection that was given to Caribbean coral reefs. This report made her realise that it was possible to force constructive change through analysis and negotiation. She greatly admired Elisabeth Mann Borgese. She joined the University of Hull as a research fellow and lecturer. She has represented the World Wide Fund for Nature at the International Maritime Organization since 1993.

== Career ==
From 2002, Gjerde served as High Seas Policy Advisor for the International Union for Conservation of Nature Global Marine and Polar Program. At the International Union for Conservation of Nature Gjerde was responsible for helping communities and governments protect the environment. In 2003, Gjerde was awarded a Pew Foundation fellowship in marine conservation to promote improved legal regimes for oceans that were beyond the jurisdiction of nations. She was elected as New York University School of Law's alumna of the month in 2004. She worked on ways to protect deep-sea coral ecosystems. Gjerde delivered a TED talk, Making law on the high seas, in 2014. Beginning in 2015, Gjerde was a member of the Cambridge Conservation Agenda for Biodiversity Beyond National Jurisdiction and the EU project Managing Impacts of Deep Sea Resource Exploitation (MIDAS). She was an adjunct professor at the Middlebury Institute of International Studies at Monterey, teaching the Masters program on International Environmental Policy. She was interested in how law, science, technology and economics can be used to manage global oceans. She was made an honorary fellow at the University of Edinburgh in 2016. She actively participated in the Biodiversity Beyond National Jurisdictions negotiations at the United Nations and the negotiations on deep sea mining regulations at the International Seabed Authority.

Gjerde delivered several keynote talks on ocean conservation. She co-founded and helped to lead the Deep Ocean Stewardship Initiative, the Deep Sea Conservation Coalition, the High Seas Alliance, the Global Ocean Biodiversity Initiative and the Sargasso Sea Project.

=== Deep Sea Conservation Coalition ===
The Deep Sea Conservation Coalition, founded in 2004, work to address to issue of bottom trawling in high seas, which has harmful impacts on the environment. They look to reduce the greatest threats to life and safeguard the health of deep-sea ecosystems.

=== Global Ocean Biodiversity Initiative ===
The Global Ocean Biodiversity Initiative is an international partnership founded in 2013 that supports conservation of biological diversity in the deep sea and open ocean. They develop data, tools and methods to identify ocean areas in need of special care. She supports this with the German Federal Agency for Nature Conservation. They found that female northern elephant seals swim halfway across the pacific to find areas to feed. They identified where white sharks congregate in the northeastern Pacific. She was involved with the 2018 celebrations for the ten-year anniversary of the initiatives.

=== Sargasso Sea Alliance ===
The Sargasso Sea Alliance, which was founded in 2010 looks to protect the health and productivity of the Sargasso Sea. It looks to serve as a model for ways to achieve protective status for areas beyond national jurisdiction. She published Lessons from the Sargasso Sea in 2016. In 2016 the Northwest Atlantic Fisheries Organization closed the Corner Rise Seamounts and New England Seamounts to bottom fishing.

=== High Seas Alliance ===
The High Seas Alliance (founded 2011) is a partnership of organisation that conserve the high seas through international cooperation and governance. They work with global leaders, non-governmental members and the International Union for Conservation of Nature.

=== Deep Ocean Stewardship Initiative ===
The Deep-Ocean Stewardship Initiative, an organization founded 2013, use stake-holder workshops, publications and surveys to engage experts in law, policy, economics and conservation. They work with national and global policymakers, as well as educators and civilians.

Gjerde won the 2018 Boat International Media Visionary Ocean Award.

=== Publications ===
Gjerde published in many journals including the Journal of Marine and Coastal Law, the Ocean Yearbook, and Science.

== Personal life and death ==
Gjerde was married to Adam de Sola Pool, who encouraged her during her academic career. The couple had a son, Darius, who is part of the steering committee for the Ocean Stewardship Award along with Gjerde and de Sola Pool.

Gjerde died in Boston of pancreatic cancer on December 26, 2025, at the age of 68.
