= Epigonus elegans =

Scientific classification
- Kingdom: Animalia
- Phylum: Chordata
- Class: Actinopterygii
- Order: Acropomatiformes
- Family: Epigonidae
- Genus: Epigonus
- Species: E. elegans

Binomial name
- Epigonus elegans Parin & Abramov, 1986

Species of ray-finned fish

Epigonus elegans is a species of ray-finned fish in the family Epigonidae found in the Southeast Pacific on the seamounts in the Nazca Ridge.
