= William M. Acton =

American lawyer and politician

William Matthew Acton (August 30, 1876 – February 16, 1957) was an American lawyer and politician.

Acton was born in Vermilion County, Illinois. He studied at Greer College in Hoopeston, Illinois and at the Danville Business College in Danville, Illinois. Acton was admitted to the Illinois bar in 1899 and practiced law in Danville. Acton served in the Illinois Senate from 1905 to 1909 and was a Republican. Acton died from a heart attack at his home in Danville, Illinois.
