= Corner Rise Seamounts =

Chain of extinct submarine volcanoes in the northern Atlantic Ocean

- The Corner Rise Seamounts

- Location within North Atlantic

Location
- Location: North Atlantic Ocean
- Coordinates: 35°23′27.8″N 51°40′39.4″W

The Corner Rise Seamounts are a chain of extinct submarine volcanoes in the northern Atlantic Ocean east of the New England Seamounts. Both it and the New England Seamounts were formed when the North American Plate moved over the Great Meteor hotspot 75 million years ago. It is the shallowest seamount in New England, with some of its nineteen highest peaks only 800–900 m deep.

Like most seamounts, they attract fish. Over 175 species have been found there, including splendid alfonsino, black cardinal fish, black scabbardfish, and wreckfish. Trawl fishing during the 1970s and 1980s resulted in approximately 20,000 tons of fish being harvested. As a result, the seamounts were closed to demersal fishing (collecting fish near the bottom of the ocean, as opposed to pelagic fishing, collecting fish near the surface) beginning 1 January 1997. The original ban was supposed to be lifted 31 December 2010, but was extended until 31 December 2020. Almost a decade into the ban, a 2005 Woods Hole Oceanographic Institution survey found that two of the peaks, Kükenthal and Yakutat, had been stripped bare of both corals and bottom-dwelling animals. However the survey, which covered both the Corner Rise and New England Seamounts, found 270 species of invertebrates and crustaceans, including 70 species unique to the Corner Rise Seamounts.

== Seamounts ==
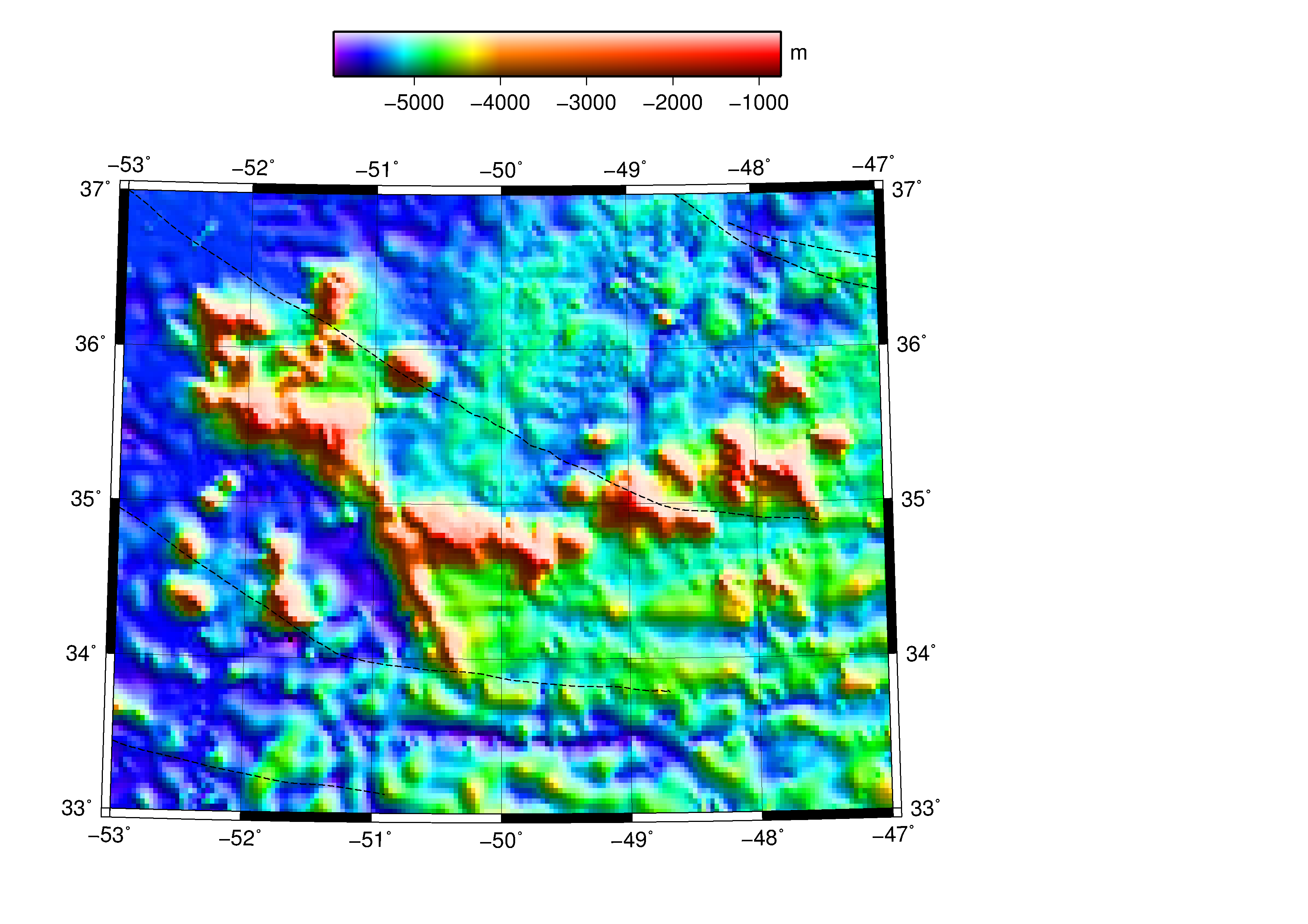
Corner Rise Seamount chain. NOAA.

Seamounts within the Corner Rise Seamount chain include:

- Bean Seamount
- Caloosahatchee Seamount with
  - Milne-Edwards Peak
  - Verrill Peak
- Castle Rock Seamount
- Corner Seamount with
  - Goode Peak
  - Kukenthal Peak
- Justus Seamount
- MacGregor Seamount
- Rockaway Seamount
- Yakutat Seamount
