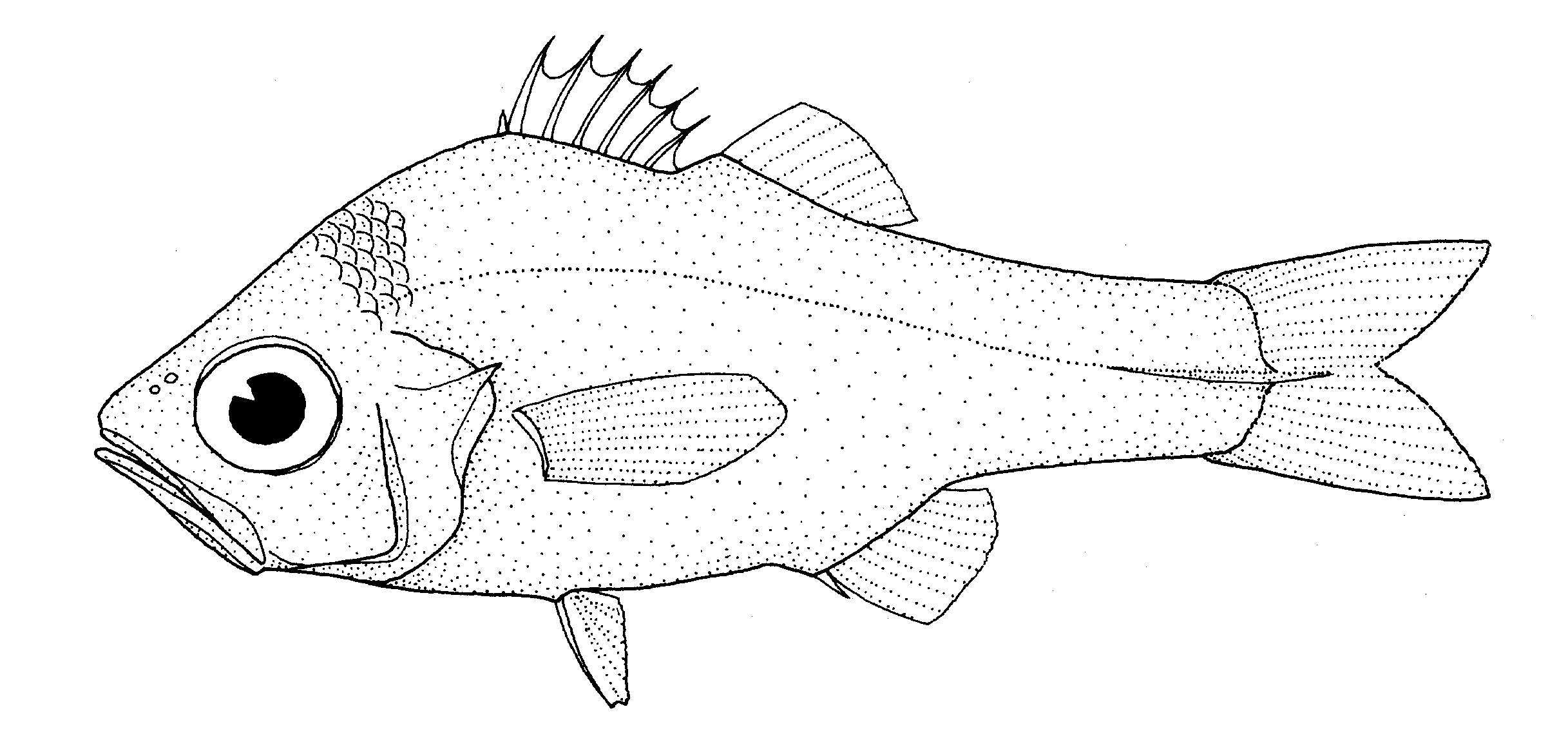
- Drawing by Dr Tony Ayling

Scientific classification
- Domain: Eukaryota
- Kingdom: Animalia
- Phylum: Chordata
- Class: Actinopterygii
- Order: Acropomatiformes
- Family: Epigonidae
- Genus: Rosenblattia; Mead & De Falla, 1965
- Species: R. robusta

Binomial name
- Rosenblattia robusta Mead & De Falla, 1965

= Stout cardinalfish =

Species of fish

The stout cardinalfish (Rosenblattia robusta) is a species of deepwater cardinalfish found around the world in southern temperate waters, where it occurs at depths from 700 to 2,000 m (2,300 to 6,560 ft). This species can reach 10 cm (3.9 in) in TL. It is currently the only known member of its genus.
