= Florenciella lugubris =

Scientific classification
- Domain: Eukaryota
- Kingdom: Animalia
- Phylum: Chordata
- Class: Actinopterygii
- Order: Acropomatiformes
- Family: Epigonidae
- Genus: Florenciella; Mead & De Falla, 1965
- Species: F. lugubris

Binomial name
- Florenciella lugubris Mead & De Falla, 1965

Species of fish

Florenciella lugubris is a species of deepwater cardinalfish native to the Indian Ocean, where it is found at depths from 150 to 800 m (490 to 2,620 ft). It grows to 10 cm (3.9 in) in TL. This species is the only known member of its genus.
