= Jessica Diamond =

American conceptual artist

- Born: Jessica Diamond; June 6, 1957 (age 68); New York, New York
- Education: School of Visual Arts, Columbia University

Jessica Diamond (born June 6, 1957) is an American conceptual artist who is known for her wall drawings and installations. She has explored themes of anti-commercialism and social and sexual roles in her artworks.

Diamond was born in New York, New York. She received her BFA from the School of Visual Arts in 1979 and her MFA from Columbia University in 1981. She has exhibited her work globally since 1983. She did a series of wall drawings influenced by and responding to the work of Japanese artist Yayoi Kusama.

Her work is in the collection of the Whitney Museum of American Art, the Hirshhorn Museum, and New York's Museum of Modern Art.
