= Florenciella (alga) =

Scientific classification
- Domain: Eukaryota
- Clade: Diaphoretickes
- Clade: Sar
- Clade: Stramenopiles
- Phylum: Gyrista
- Subphylum: Ochrophytina
- Class: Dictyochophyceae
- Order: Florenciellales
- Genus: Florenciella; Eikrem

Genus of single-celled organisms

Florenciella is a genus of heterokonts.
