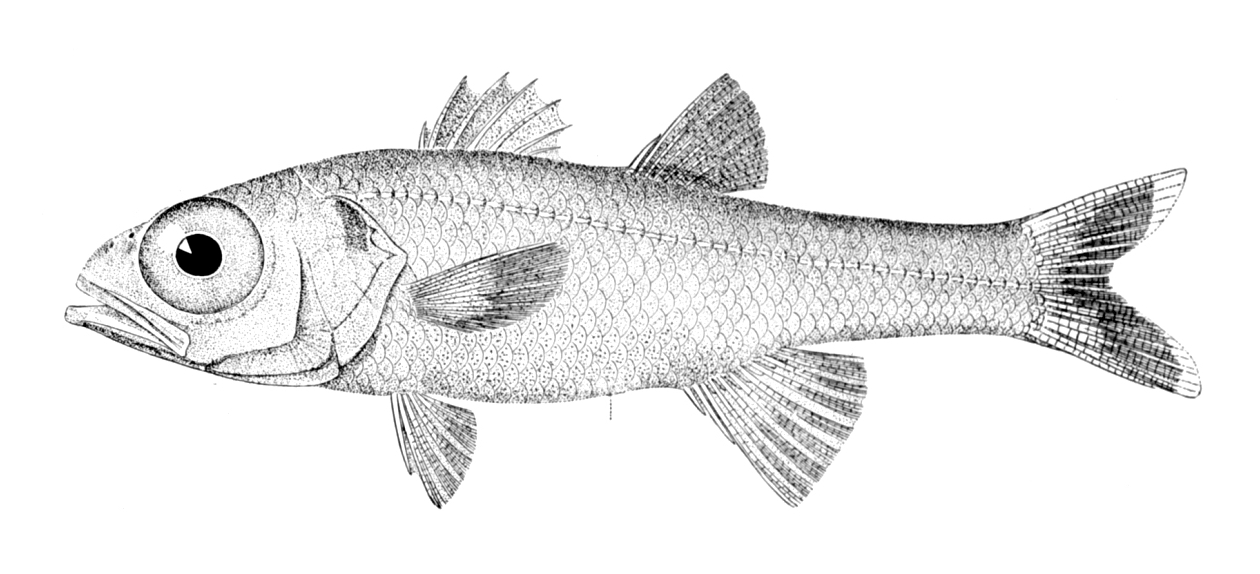
- Bigeye, Epigonus pandionis

Scientific classification
- Kingdom: Animalia
- Phylum: Chordata
- Class: Actinopterygii
- Order: Acropomatiformes
- Family: Epigonidae; Poey, 1861

Genera
- See text

= Epigonidae =

Epigonidae Temporal range: Early Eocene to present

Family of ray-finned fishes

Epigonidae, the deepwater cardinalfishes, are a family of acropomatiform ray-finned fishes. The family includes about 43 species. Despite their name, they are not closely related to the true cardinalfishes of the family Apogonidae.

They are small fishes: the largest, Epigonus telescopus, reaches 75 cm (30 in) in length, and most grow to no more than 20 cm (7.9 in) or so.

They are found in temperate and tropical oceans throughout the world. They are bathydemersal fishes (inhabiting deep waters close to the sea bed) and have been found at depths of 3,000 m (9,800 ft).

Fossil epigonid skeletons, tentatively assigned to Epigonus, are known from the earliest Eocene-aged Danata Formation of Turkmenistan.

== Genera ==
The following genera are included in the family:

- Brephostoma Alcock, 1889
- Epigonus Rafinesque, 1810
- Florenciella Mead & de Falla, 1965
- Microichthys Rüppell, 1852
- Rosenblattia Mead & de Falla, 1965
- Sphyraenops Gill, 1861
