= Fryxell =

Fryxell is a surname. It is most commonly used in Sweden and America. Notable people with the surname include:

- Anders Fryxell (1795–1881), Swedish historian
- Fritiof Fryxell (1900–1986), American geologist and mountaineer
- Greta Fryxell, (1926–2017), American marine scientist
- Paul Fryxell (1927–2011), American botanist
- Regina Fryxell (1899–1993), composer of Lutheran hymns
- Roald H. Fryxell (1934–1974), American geologist and archaeologist

== See also ==
- Fryxell (crater), a lunar crater
- Lake Fryxell in Antarctica
