= Leslie E. Wildesen =

American archaeologist (1944-2014)

Leslie Elizabeth Wildesen
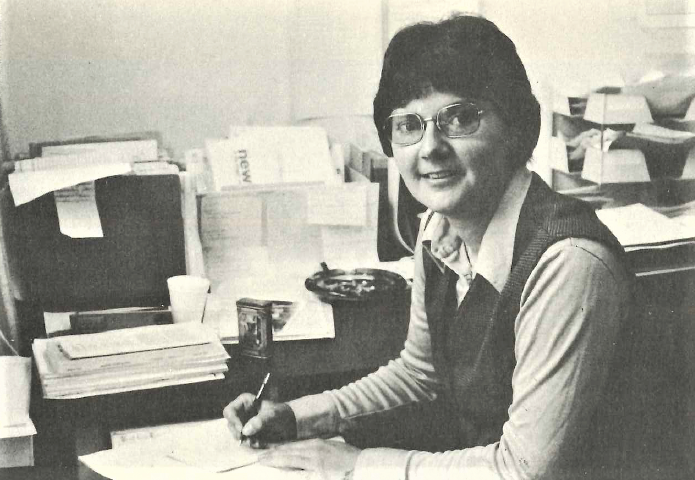
- Wildesen in 1981
- Born: December 5, 1944; Phoenix, Arizona, U.S.
- Died: January 24, 2014 (aged 69); Portland, Oregon, U.S.
- Occupation: Archaeologist
- Years active: 1966–2008
- Known for: First woman archaeologist for the Forest Service First Pacific Northwest Region archaeologist in the Forest Service Authored first government guidebook for cultural resources management
- Spouse: Jeanne Crouch

Leslie E. Wildesen (1944 – 2014) was an American archaeologist best known for her work in policy-making. As the first woman archaeologist in the United States Forest Service and the first regional archaeologist in the Pacific Northwest, she wrote the first guidebook used by a government agency for the management of cultural resources. Throughout her career, she made great strides in public involvement in archaeology, collaboration with Native American tribes, protection of Native American burials, and environmental policy implementation. She developed numerous training programs regarding the National Environmental Policy Act (NEPA) and environmental law.

== Early life ==
Leslie E. Wildesen was born on December 5, 1944, in Phoenix, Arizona to Jane Wildesen Allstrom and Allan Allstrom. Following her birth, her parents divorced, and Wildesen was left in the care of her maternal grandmother, Frances Hills. Hills endeavored to give Wildesen the “ladylike” and elegant demeanor that she herself had learned in finishing schools, and therefore did not allow her granddaughter any experience with the outdoors. At the age of four, Wildesen contracted rheumatic fever, which left her needing a wheelchair for six years, until she was cured after the discovery of penicillin. As a child and a teenager, Wildesen was interested in music, writing, photography, math, and science.

== Education ==
Wildesen attended Stanford University for her undergraduate education, as the institution had been chosen for her by her grandmother, who thought it would be a good place for Wildesen to find a husband. At Stanford, she majored in English with a concentration in creative writing, and found a lifelong passion for playing the guitar. While taking an Introduction to Anthropology course, Wildesen so intensely disliked the ethnographic films shown to the class that she decided that it would be her personal goal to produce better ethnographic content, and she altered her plans for graduate school accordingly.

After earning her BA from Stanford University, Wildesen enrolled in graduate courses at San Francisco State College. During her Master's education, she began working in archaeology, but described her own beginnings in this discipline as entirely accidental. She happened to walk into a lab one day, and later stated "I was home, and that was how I felt- and still feel- about archaeology." Wildesen earned her MA in 1970, with her thesis titled “Temporal and Areal Relations in Alameda County California.”

While working on her MA, Wildesen realized that her interests in archaeology were more in the subject of geological analysis, so she began work on her PhD at Washington State University. There, she worked for geologist Dr. Roald Fryxell as a research assistant, and attended an archaeological field school in 1971 with Dr. Richard Daugherty at Ozette. Wildesen earned her PhD in 1973 with her dissertation titled “A Quantitative Model of Archaeological Site Development."

== Career ==
After earning her PhD at Washington State University, Wildesen began to apply for faculty positions at several universities. However, it quickly became clear to her that most of the universities did not value her as an archaeologist, and were simply searching for any woman they could add to their faculty. Finally, she found a position as a senior research assistant at the University of California at Riverside. She eventually decided to leave this position, as male students did not respect her in the classroom, and the department overworked and underpaid her. Wildesen took a position with the Forest Service in 1974 in Portland, Oregon, as the position was new and offered a certain degree of professional freedom.

Upon joining the Forest Service in 1974, Wildesen was the first archaeologist the agency had in the Pacific Northwest, and the Forest Service's very first woman archaeologist. During her time with the Forest Service in the Pacific Northwest, she was responsible for 19 national forests, and wrote the very first guidebook used by a government agency for the management of cultural resources. In 1976, Wildesen was the editor of “The Conservation of Cultural Resources: A Reader” which was a collection of writings on Cultural Resource Management (CRM).

In 1981, Leslie Wildesen was featured in a chapter of Barbara Williams's book Breakthrough: Women in Archaeology, in which she expressed frustration with the sexism which pervaded the Forest Service office in which she worked, and expressed restlessness with working in bureaucracy, stating that she wished she had a physical, demonstrable end product to her work. In the early 1980s, Wildesen left government work and began consulting privately, held a position as Secretary of the Society of American Archaeology, was a member of Oregon's State Historic Review Board, and was an adjunct faculty member in the Public History program at Portland State University. While consulting privately, she established the resource management plan for River of No Return Wilderness, Idaho upon its creation in 1982. During this time, she successfully lobbied for state legislation protecting Native American burials in Oregon, well before the passage of the Native American Graves Protection and Repatriation Act (NAGPRA). Throughout her career, Wildesen worked with more than 25 Native American tribes to pass similar legislation, coordinate reburials, and conduct CRM compliance training.

In 1982, the American Anthropological Association awarded Wildesen a Congressional Fellowship, and she served as a staff member for the US House of Representatives Subcommittee on Public Lands and National Parks. During the 1980s, President Ronald Reagan appointed her to three consecutive terms as an expert member of the Cultural Property Advisory Committee, overseeing US involvement in UNESCO Convention on International Trafficking in Cultural Property.

In 1984, Wildesen relocated to Colorado after being appointed the Deputy State Historic Preservation Officer and State Archaeologist, a position in which she remained until 1989. While in Colorado, she successfully passed Native American grave protection legislation similar to the legislation for which she lobbied in Oregon. While she was the Colorado State Archaeologist, she was a member of the Program Administration Committee of the National Conference of State Historic Preservation Officers. In 1985, she was a member of the Technologies for the Preservation of Archaeological Sites and Structures Group, and in 1986, she wrote a remembrance for Dr. Roald Fryxell of Washington State University.

Wildesen briefly left Colorado to take a year-long position in Pittsburgh, Pennsylvania working with the Office of Surface Mining before returning as the Regional Archaeologist for the Forest Service in the Rocky Mountain Region. In 1993, Wildesen co-founded Environmental Training and Consulting International, Inc. (ETCI] with her life partner, Jeanne Crouch. From 1996–1999, Wildesen served as chair of the National Environmental Policy Act (NEPA) training committee for National Association of Environmental Professionals, where she focused on developing workshops for continuing education.

Wildesen had an interest in education and training throughout her career, and after co-founding ETCI, she developed several training programs and seminars focused on environmental law, such as: Bulletproofing your NEPA Document with Professor Dan Mandelker of the Washington University in St. Louis School of Law, Working with NEPA: Strategies to Improve the Effectiveness of NEPA Planning with Executive Enterprises, Inc., and The Smithsonian Environmental Leadership Course with the Smithsonian Institution/s Conservation Research Center. She also developed ECTI's Big Book of NEPA Checklists and Protocols, which is still in use today, and ECTI's “NEPA Toolbox” workshops to improve compliance with NEPA.

While developing NEPA training, she focused on environmental impacts and cultural resource management in the United States and beyond, presenting at diverse meetings such as the Spectrum Conference in 1996, the Colorado Pollution Prevention Forum in 1998, the Malaysian Cleaner Production Conference in 1999, the Asian Business Summit in 2000, and the International Association for Impact Assessment Conference in Hong Kong in 2000. Additionally, Wildesen volunteered on projects in Zimbabwe in 1997 and in Sri Lanka in 2000, to assist local agencies and firms in developing stronger environmental management systems.

During this time, she was appointed to serve on the Colorado Front Range Resource Advisory Council in 1998, and again in 2002.

== Contribution to Cultural Resource Management ==
Throughout her career, Wildesen conducted numerous public involvement projects for the US Army Corps of Engineers, the US Department of Energy, and the US Forest Service. Showing a lifelong interest in public engagement, she gave historic tours of Portland to the public in 1981, and presented on Perspectives in Public Involvement at the 23rd Annual Conference of the National Association of Environmental Professionals in 1998.

Not only did Wildesen have an interest in the ethics of public archaeology, she held in high importance the ethics and values associated with cultural resource management (CRM), writing the “Archaeological Values” section of a 1970 publication on Recreation in the Great Basin Region, commenting on “Contract Standards for Archaeological Studies” at the 1974 Cultural Resource Management Conference in Denver, Colorado, and writing “The Search for an Ethic in Archaeology: An Historical Perspective” in Ethics and Values in Archaeology in 1984.

Leslie Wildesen described her own professional interests as regarding policymaking, sediments, paleoenvironments, and theory. During her career of over four decades, Leslie Wildesen wrote and delivered over 250 professional papers and presentations, consulted with over 25 Native American tribes, served on numerous committees, and taught multitudes of seminars and trainings to the next generations of CRM professionals.

== Personal life ==
While publishing professionally throughout her career, Wildesen published two non-fiction books. These were Hospitality Forever: Sustainability in the World’s Largest Industry for hotels, and Just Attitude, about her experiences with cancer treatment. In 2009, Wildesen took up speculative fiction writing, as well as photography. Following a lifelong love of music, she also began composing music through Aerial Warthog Productions.

Wildesen married her life-partner Jeanne Crouch on January 10, 2014, in Vancouver, Washington, following a 28-year relationship.

Leslie Wildesen died of breast cancer on January 24, 2014, in her home in Portland, Oregon.
