= Bennie Carlton Keel =

American archaeologist (1934–2026)

Bennie Carlton Keel (December 26, 1934 – January 11, 2026) was an American archaeologist who made contributions to the foundational understanding of Cherokee archaeology and culture, North Carolina archaeology, and to the development of Americanist cultural resource management (CRM).

== Background ==
Keel was born in 1934 and grew up in Panama City, Florida. He played the trumpet while in elementary school. He graduated from Bay High School in 1952 and completed one year of college at Florida State University (FSU) prior to attending boot camp at Fort Gordon, Georgia, then serving in the U.S. Army for three years (1954–1957) as a military policeman with the 11th Airborne Division. He was introduced to anthropology in an introductory social science course taught by Charles H. Fairbanks and attended the 1959 FSU archaeological field school in the Weiss Reservoir in northern Alabama.

He completed his B.S. at FSU in 1960, and in 1965 earned his M.S. from FSU. His thesis was published in Southern Indian Studies as "The Preservation of Archaeological and Ethnological Specimens". Keel earned his PhD in 1972 at Washington State University in Pullman. His dissertation, Woodland Phases of the Appalachian Summit Area was revised and published by the University of Tennessee Press as Cherokee Archaeology: A Study of the Appalachian Summit.

Keel died on January 11, 2026, at the age of 91.

== Career ==
Keel directed the final Weiss Reservoir data recovery program in 1960, which was overseen by archaeologist David L. DeJarnette. From 1961 to 1963, he worked under Joffre Coe as an archaeologist at the Town Creek Indian Mound in North Carolina. In the summer of 1963, he became the senior staff archaeologist at Research Laboratories of Anthropology (RLA), now called Research Laboratories of Archaeology at the University of North Carolina at Chapel Hill. Keel served in this position for ten years. From 1973 to 1976 he was an assistant professor of anthropology at Wright State University in Dayton, Ohio directing the university's archaeological field school in the Tennessee Valley Authority’s Normandy Reservoir project. After receiving tenure and promotion in early 1976, he resigned and in June 1976 he joined National Park Service (NPS) as Chief of Interagency Archaeological Services Atlanta and in February 1980 he moved to Washington, D.C. where he worked as the Departmental Consulting Archaeologist and NPS Assistant Director – Archaeology until June 1990 when he transferred to the NPS Southeast Archaeology Center (SEAC) in Tallahassee, Florida as Regional Archaeologist and Center Director until his retirement in March 2008. Keel passed away in January 2026 in Tallahassee, Florida.

=== Contributions to southeastern archaeology ===
Keel's contributions southeastern archaeology, in particular to the development of North Carolina and Cherokee archaeology, were detailed in a special issue of Southeastern Archaeology in 2010 after his retirement from the National Park Service in 2008. As noted by R.P. Stephen Davis Jr., over Keel's 50 year career including his work in North Carolina he "made lasting contributions to public archaeology and our understanding of the archaeological record, particularly as it relates to Cherokee ancestry and native peoples of the Piedmont region. Moreover, through his fieldwork at sites such as Garden Creek, Coweeta Creek, and Upper Saratown, he helped train dozens of future archaeologists, and the experience he gained from these projects served him well as one of the federal government's principal advocates for archaeology over the past three decades."

During his tenure at the RLA he conducted surveys and excavations from Manteo, NC to Murphy, NC. The more significant of these efforts include the excavations at the Forbush, Hardins, Belk Farms, Upper Saratown sites and the Red Springs Mound, His six field seasons (1964–67; 1970–71) in western North Carolina resulted in his Cherokee Archaeology, which serves as a foundation for modern Cherokee research.

During his time at the Southeast Archaeological Center he carried out multi-year excavations at Charles Pinckney National Historic Site, Fort Raleigh National Historic Site and Cane River Creole National Historic Site. Before retiring, Keel worked with the National Park Service, Eastern Band of Cherokee Indians, North Carolina State Historic Preservation Office, and the Advisory Council on Historic Preservation to develop a Memorandum of Agreement (MOA) for the land exchange between the Band and Great Smoky Mountain National Park. This involved creating the data recovery plan, which was a multimillion-dollar project paid for by the Band. In his retirement he continues to contribute to Cherokee archaeology.

=== Contributions to cultural resource management ===
Keel's career developed in tandem with the growth of cultural resource management (CRM) and public archaeology in the USA. Keel played a fundamental role in several significant salvage archaeology projects, including his first experience in the field at the Hog Town Bayou site in 1959. Other prominent salvage projects Keel has been a part of include the Marmes Rockshelter conducted by Washington State University, with archaeologist Roald Fryxell, from 1968 to 1969.

Keel played a major role in supporting the passing of critical legislation and in overseeing development of regulations directed at preservation of cultural heritage that has had widespread and continuing impacts to the present day. This includes the passage of the Abandoned Shipwreck Act and key amendments to the Archaeological Resource Protection Act (ARPA). Additionally, Keel oversaw development of the Abandoned Shipwreck Act Guidelines and the regulations (36 CFR 79) establishing much needed procedures for the curation of federally owned and administered archaeological collections. The National Archaeological Database (NADB) and the NPS Cultural Sites Inventory were developed under his direction. He developed a peer review program for federal archaeological projects and cultural conservation and reported to Congress on Federal Archaeology. He promoted the publication of popular summaries of major projects for the general public.

== Awards and honors ==
Keel was named as a 1960 Fellow in the Social Sciences at FSU and 1967 award for a National Defense Education Act fellowship at WSU. In 1979 he was honored with a Department of the Interior Superior Service Award. The Society of Professional Archaeologists (later named the Register of Professional Archaeologists) awarded him its Distinguished Achievement Award In 1993. In 2008 he was awarded the Southeastern Archaeological Conference's Lifetime Award and four years later he was awarded the Society for American Archaeology's Lifetime Achievement Award. A special issue of the journal Southeastern Archaeology included a series of papers given in his honor that recognized his contributions to the development of Cherokee, North Carolina, and public archaeology.
