= Janet Friedman =

American archaeologist

- Born: December 21, 1945; Minneapolis, Minnesota, U.S.
- Died: January 24, 2002 (aged 56)
- Education: Washington State University
- Occupation: Archaeologist
- Known for: Cultural Resource Management Archaeological Resources Protection Act of 1979 Ozette Village Site
- Spouse: Edward (Ed) Friedman (married 1964–1983)

Janet Friedman (21 December 1945 – 24 January 2002) was an American archaeologist who made major contributions to cultural resource management. She was also an early contributor to the development of wet site archaeology. As head archaeologist for the United States Forest Service (USFS) and later as Federal Preservation Officer for the Department of Agriculture (USDA) and member of the Advisory Council on Historic Preservation (ACHP), Friedman was actively involved in developing the Archaeological Resources Protection Act of 1979 (ARPA) from its naissance. She was a member of the Society for American Archaeology (SAA), the Women's Council on Energy and the Environment, and the Mid-Atlantic Archaeological Conference and, as one of the first female students in Washington State University's (WSU) Anthropology doctoral program, she actively mentored women in cultural and environmental sciences throughout her career, promoting gender equality in the field.

== Early life ==
Janet Friedman was born in Minneapolis, Minnesota in 1945. During her childhood, her family relocated to Los Angeles, California, where she attended high school in North Hollywood. She met her husband, Edward (Ed) Friedman, in Los Angeles and they were married in 1964, and their first son, Daniel, was born in 1965. The two remained married until 1983.

Interested in social work, the pair enrolled in the Anthropology program at WSU in Pullman, Washington. (Friedman 2019) Looking for work summer work after their first semester, the couple contacted Richard Daugherty in the Anthropology Department, knowing that the department was involved in archaeological field work. The first option they were given did not work, as the field director refused to have pregnant women on site despite being located in a populated area. Daugherty, not taking issue with Janet's pregnancy, offered the couple graduate student positions with the Ozette Archaeological Project in Washington State. Their second son, Roger, was born in 1970.

Both Janet and Ed worked at Ozette from 1970 to 1971, and then moved to positions at Neah Bay until Ed finished his PhD in 1976, Janet having completed her dissertation in 1975, entitled The Prehistoric Uses of Wood at the Ozette Archaeological Site. While in Neah Bay, Janet acted as research archaeologist and Laboratory Director from 1973 to 1976. Janet came to be referred to as one of 'Daugherty's Daughters' during her time at WSU, as she was one of six in the first generation of female students in WSU's doctoral program.

== Career ==
After finishing up her work at Ozette, Janet Friedman briefly took a job as research archaeologist running a cultural resource program for Northern California State University, Chico, in 1976, before moving to the position of Archaeologist for the Hells Canyon National Recreation Area Planning Team, which encompassed portions of the Nez Perce, Payette, and Wallowa-Whitman National Forests. Friedman helped write management plans for the Hells Canyon National Recreation Area and the Snake River in Oregon and Idaho. She advocated for the consideration of cultural resources in planning and management decisions as a means of ending the extensive looting that was taking place in the forests. In 1978, Friedman became the chief archaeologist and director of cultural resources management with the Forest Service in Washington, D.C., where she managed nearly 100 cultural resource professionals across nine regional and field offices.

Friedman represented the Forest Service at a January 9, 1979, meeting with the House Interior Committee to review what was, at the time, the Sheenhan-Neuman draft of what would become ARPA and to develop regulations for the act, in an effort to strengthen the permit and penalty provisions put forward by the 1906 Antiquities Act. Friedman then moved up to the United States Department of Agriculture as assistant director of the Office of Environmental Quality that same year, and later became the department's federal preservation officer in 1980, where she was assigned to represent the Secretary of Agriculture on the ACHP, and continuing work on ARPA throughout this period of her career. She continued to act as a private consultant for the ACHP after President Ronald Reagan dissolved the Office of Environmental Quality in 1982.

Friedman's next line of work was as senior environmental scientist for United Engineers and Constructors, providing historic preservation, environmental review, and tribal consultation services to the United States Department of Energy's (DOE) nuclear waste repository siting program. In 1987 she was project director for SRA Technologies, Inc., where she managed the Environmental Impact Statement of DOE's high-level nuclear waste repository. After this, she began supervising environmental review work for Dames and Moore, Inc. in Bethesda, Maryland, a company with which she would produce a multitude of reports over the remainder of her career. It was around this time, 1988, that she received her diagnosis of leukemia, from which she would die 14 years later on January 24, 2002.

=== Contributions to cultural resource management (CRM) ===
Janet Friedman made substantial contributions to public archaeology or cultural resource management in the United States beginning in the 1970s. Early in her career, Friedman recognized government agencies as a means to make positive contributions to the field of archaeology and specifically as a means to protect and better manage the cultural environment. During her participation in developing ARPA, Friedman advocated for clear and specific yet broad and flexible, content dependent definitions of what constitutes an antiquity to avoid the vague definition provided in the 1906 Antiquities Act that failed as a viable tool for protecting antiquities. (Friedman 1985b). She additionally advocated for the 'living archaeology' approach as a way to engage the public and also to engage and ensure involvement of native descendants of archaeological sites, a crucial part of the success of the Ozette Project that she was involved in at WSU.

== Legacy ==
In addition to her work on ARPA and developing planning and management strategies for cultural resources on Forest Service Lands, Friedman also paved the way for more women to follow her into the field of Cultural Resource Management (CRM). She mentored women in CRM, advocating for increased gender equality in archaeology and leading by example. Friedman acted not just as a mentor to archaeologists, but to young professionals in a variety of fields involving resource management. The Janet Friedman Memorial Fellowship continues to give support to graduate students at WSU with an emphasis on female students interested in cultural resource management.

== Bibliography ==
=== Selected journal articles and book chapters ===
- Daugherty, Richard, and Janet Friedman (1983). An Introduction to Ozette Art. In Indian Art Traditions of the Northwest Coast, edited by R.L. Carlson, pp. 183–195. Archaeology Press, Simon Fraser University, Burnaby, BC.
- Friedman, Janet (1981). Archaeological Resources Protection Act Law Enforcement Training. Anthropology News, 22(5): 6.
- Friedman, Janet (1983). Woman as Applied Archaeologist: A Personal Perspective. Women Practicing Anthropology, 6(1): 6–7.
- Friedman, Janet (Ed.), (1985a). A History of the Archaeological Resources Protection Act: Laws and Regulations. Special Section, American Archaeology 5(2): 81–118.
- Friedman, Janet (1985b). The Regulations: The Early Years. American Archaeology 94, 5(2): 94–101.
- Friedman, Janet (1985c). ARPA Law-enforcement Training. American Archaeology 94, 5(2):108–109.
- Friedman, Janet L. and Barbara J. Little (1993). Protecting cultural resources in managing chemical pollution. Journal of Hazardous Materials, 35(2): 229–239.

=== Dissertation ===
- Friedman, Janet (1975). The Prehistoric Uses of Wood at the Ozette Archaeological Site. Washington State University. Pullman, WA.

=== Selected reports and books ===
- Friedman, Janet (1976). Archaeological Overview for the Mt. Dome and Timbered Craters Regions, North Central California. Archaeological Overview for the Mt. Dome and Timbered Craters Regions, North Central California. California Historic Resource Information System, California State University, Chico.
- Friedman, Janet (1978a). Cultural Resources Protection Plan, Hells Canyon National Recreation Area. Hells Canyon NRA, Wallowa-Whitman National Forest. Baker, OR.
- Friedman, Janet (1978b). Wood Identification by Microscopic Examination: A Guide for the Archaeologist on the Northwest Coast of North America. British Columbia Provincial Museum. Victoria, BC.
- Friedman, Janet (1978). Paleontological overview, Hells Canyon National Recreation Area. November 1978. Hells Canyon NRA, Wallowa-Whitman National Forest. Baker, OR.
- Friedman, Janet (1981). Cultural resource protection in Hells Canyon NRA or how much does an artifact cost? In Cultural resources law enforcement: An emerging science, compiled by D.F. Green and P. Davis. U.S.D.A. Forest Service, Southwestern Region.
- Friedman, Janet (1982). Archaeological Overview, Hells Canyon National Recreation Area. Vol. 1. Hells Canyon NRA, Wallowa-Whitman National Forest. Baker, OR.

=== As editor ===
- with M. J. Rowlands (1977). The Evolution of Social Systems. Duckworth, London.
