= Richard Daugherty =

American archaeologist

Richard D. Daugherty
- Born: March 31, 1922; Aberdeen, Washington, U.S.
- Died: February 22, 2014 (aged 91); Pullman, Washington, U.S.
- Education: University of Washington
- Occupation: Archaeologist
- Known for: Marmes Rockshelter; Manis Mastodon site; Ozette Village Site
- Spouses: Phyllis McCullough (married 1944–2002); Ruth Kirk (author) (married 2007–2014)

Richard Deo Daugherty (March 31, 1922 – February 22, 2014) was an American archaeologist and professor, who led the excavation of the Ozette Indian Village Archeological Site in Washington state during the 1970s. The Ozette Indian Village, which was buried and preserved in a mudslide in the 1700s, has been called "the most significant archaeological dig of the 20th century" in the Pacific Northwest. Daugherty collaborated closely with the Makah during the dig, which uncovered more than 55,000 artifacts.

== Early life and education ==
"Doc" Daugherty was born in Aberdeen, Washington, on the Olympic Peninsula, on March 31, 1922. He developed an interest in archaeology as a child when he found buried objects around Grays Harbor. He enlisted during World War II. Daugherty was based at Naval Air Engineering Station Lakehurst in Lakehurst, New Jersey, where he flew blimps over the Atlantic to watch for potential German attacks.

He enrolled at the University of Washington after the war, where he completed his bachelor’s degree in anthropology in 1946. He began work toward a doctorate in ethnography shortly thereafter. His dissertation studies were ultimately completed in 1953 but were at first delayed after he and several other graduate students oversaw salvage archaeological field work prior to dam construction at sites in the Columbia Plateau during the Columbia River Basin Surveys of 1946–1947. These were projects were enormous in scale—Daugherty, along with other young students, were tasked with surveying numerous reservoir sites throughout Washington, Idaho, and Montana. Reflecting years later, Daugherty stated that they had "little knowledge, almost no time, and they [the surveys] were extremely inadequate." Still, this early work led to important discoveries at sites including Lind Coulee, which was the subject of his 1953 Ph.D. dissertation, Early Man in the Columbia Intermontane Province.

== Pacific Northwest archaeology at Washington State University ==
Daugherty joined Washington State University (WSU)—then Washington State College—as an instructor in anthropology in 1950 until the completion of his Ph.D., after which he was appointed an assistant professor in the Department of Anthropology. Daugherty's early experiences growing up in the Olympic Peninsula as well as his survey and Ph.D studies set the stage for later field studies and his career, which had an enormous impact on archaeological research in the Pacific Northwest region. Daugherty led multiple projects at WSU using contract archaeology and archaeological field schools all throughout the Columbia Plateau and Pacific Northwest Coast.

While at WSU, Daugherty led the establishment of a Quaternary research studies option in 1968 and recruited a team of interdisciplinary scholars, including zooarchaeologist Carl "Gus" Gustafson, geologist Roald H. Fryxell, palynologist Peter J. Mehringer, and Frank C. Leonhardy. Other colleagues included William Andrefsky, Vaughn Bryant, Donald Collier, William Lipe, Charles M. Nelson, David G. Rice, Harvey "Pete" Rice, and Roderick Sprague. "Doc" Daugherty also mentored or served on the committee of numerous students at WSU who became important archaeologists in their own right, including Kenneth Ames, Fumi Arakawa, Corey Breternitz, Mary Collins, Dale Croes, Judith Bense, Amy Gilreath, Leslie E. Wildesen, Janet Friedman, Paul Gleeson, Steve Hackenberger, Bennie Keel, David Kirkpatrick, Ruthann Knudson, Oscar L. Mallory, Anan Raymond, Lee Sappington, Alston Thoms, Gary Wessen, Miranda Warburton, among others.

Today, there are two scholarships in Daugherty's honor at WSU, the Phyllis and Richard Daugherty Scholarship for Undergraduate Student Excellence and the Phyllis and Richard Daugherty Scholarship for Graduate Student Excellence. Collections associated with Daugherty's archaeological excavations include those housed at curation facilities at the WSU Museum of Anthropology, the Makah Museum, the Confederated Tribes of the Colville Reservation History and Archaeology Division, and the University of Idaho Bowers Laboratory. Additionally, the Manuscripts, Archives, and Special Collections (MASC) at WSU houses the Richard D. Daugherty Papers, which include professional papers such as "correspondence, files related to his contracting business (Western Heritage Inc.), project files, papers related to his research and writing, and collected reference material."

== Contributions to cultural resource management ==
Daugherty played a central role in shaping the role of archaeology in documenting and preserving archaeological heritage threatened by large-scale civic engineering projects. Before and after joining Washington State University as a faculty member, Daugherty took part in the Smithsonian Institution River Basin Surveys that preceded dam construction on the Columbia River. Through these surveys Daugherty, his colleagues, and students documented many important archaeological sites at Lind Coulee, Potholes Reservoir, Moses Lake, and elsewhere. In connection with this work Daugherty founded and directed the Washington Archaeological Research center at Washington State University, which became assumed an important role in early contract archaeology in the Pacific Northwest United States. Daugherty also directed the excavation of the Marmes Rockshelter, in which 10,000-year-old human remains were discovered, before the area was submerged by water due to the construction of the Lower Monumental Dam on the Snake River in 1969.

In 1966, Daugherty joined with both Washington state U.S. senators, Sen. Henry M. Jackson and Warren Magnuson, to successfully pass the National Historic Preservation Act of 1966. Subsequently, he was appointed by Lyndon Johnson as one of the original four expert members of the Advisory Council on Historic Preservation. Many of "Doc's" students went on to have major careers in cultural resource management and public archaeology, including Judith Bense, Leslie E. Wildesen, Janet Friedman, Paul Gleeson, Bennie Keel, Ruthann Knudson, Gary Wessen, to name a few.

== Ozette Indian Village Archaeological Site and Tribal Collaboration ==
In 1970, a winter storm uncovered the remains of a pre-European village at Cape Alava, now known as the Ozette Indian Village Archeological Site, which had been buried by a mudslide in the 1700s. Edward Eugene Claplanhoo, who was chairman of the Makah at the time, immediately recognized the significance of the discovery. Claplanhoo contacted Richard Daugherty at Washington State University. Daugherty and Claplanhoo had known each other since the 1950s. In the early 1950s, Daugherty has served as the WCU freshman class adviser when Claplanhoo held office as the freshman class treasurer.

Daugherty sought the advice of Claplanhoo and other Makah leaders during the excavation. While it is common today to consult with local and indigenous communities, Daugherty's manner of working with Makah officials was considered revolutionary at the time. According to Janine Bowechop, a historic preservation officer for the Makah, "He was so progressive at a time when it was so uncommon...Dr. Daugherty taught people how tribes and scientists can work together." Claplanhoo lobbied on behalf of the Makah to keep the Ozette artifacts in local hands. The artifacts are now housed and displayed at the Makah Museum, which opened in 1979. In 2010, Ruth Kirk, an author of books on Ozette (and Daugherty's wife since 2007), spoke of Daugherty's and Claplanhoo close partnership on Ozette dig saying, "Ed and Dick were really instrumental in getting the museum set up. Usually, back then, artifacts were taken back to the university, but here Dick always wanted them, and Ed worked with him because the Makah wanted them to stay in Neah Bay...Now it is common to do that, but back then it was a new idea."

Daugherty and Ruth Kirk, a nature writer, co-authored Hunters of the Whale, which explored the early years of the Ozette Indian Village Archeological Site through 1974. Kirk and Daugherty often collaborated, publishing, among other works another book, Archaeology in Washington, released in 2007.

== Later life and death ==
Daugherty retired from Washington State University in 1983 after chairing dozens of graduate student committees and serving as chair of the Anthropology department. Daugherty continued his work in cultural resource management over the next decades through his private consulting firm Western Heritage, publishing numerous professional reports.

Ruth Kirk and Daugherty, who were both widowed and longtime friends, married in 2007 in a wedding held in a historic replica of an Ozette-era longhouse.

Richard Daugherty died in Pullman, Washington, on February 22, 2014, at the age of 91. He was a resident of the Panorama retirement community in Lacey, Washington, at the time. His wife, Ruth Kirk, had just completed a draft of a new book on the Ozette Indian Village a few days before his death.

== Bibliography ==
=== Authored and Co-Authored Books ===
- Daugherty, Richard D. (1956). Early Man in the Columbia Intermontane Province. University of Utah Department of Anthropology Anthropological Papers No. 24. Adapted by the author from his doctoral thesis.
- Daugherty, Richard D. (1973). The Yakima People. Phoenix: Indian Tribal Series.
- Kirk, Ruth; Daugherty, Richard D. (1974). Hunters of the Whale: An Adventure in Northwest Coast Archaeology. New York: Morrow. ISBN 978-0688201098.
- Kirk, Ruth; Daugherty, Richard D. (1978). Exploring Washington Archaeology. Seattle: University of Washington Press. ISBN 978-0295956107.
- Kirk, Ruth; Daugherty, Richard D. (2007). Archaeology in Washington. Seattle: University of Washington Press. ISBN 978-0-295-98697-5.

=== Selected journal articles ===
- Daugherty, Richard D. (1952). "Archaeological Investigations in O'Sullivan Reservoir, Grant County, Washington". American Antiquity. 17 (4): 374–383. doi:10.2307/276525. JSTOR 276525. S2CID 163260404.
- Daugherty, Richard D. (1956). "Archaeology of the Lind Coulee Site, Washington". Proceedings of the American Philosophical Society. 100 (3): 223–278.
- Gustafson, Carl E.; Gilbow, Delbert W.; Daugherty, Richard D. (1979). "The Manis Mastodon Site: Early Man on the Olympic Peninsula". Canadian Journal of Archaeology. 3: 187–164.
