= Judith A. Bense =

American academic

President of the University of West Florida
- In office 2008–2016
- Preceded by: John C. Cavanaugh
- Succeeded by: Martha Dunagin Saunders

Personal details
- Born: March 29, 1945 (age 81)
- Education: Florida State University; Washington State University
- Profession: Academic Administrator
- Website: https://uwf.edu/cassh/departments/anthropology/faculty/judith-bense.html

Judith Ann Bense is an American academic, Florida historical archaeologist, and a former president of the University of West Florida. She served as a faculty member and department chair in the anthropology program, which she started at the school. In 2008, she started her 7-year term as president of the university. Before this, she was the executive director of anthropology and archaeology at UWF. During her career, she was fundamental in drafting the legislation to create the Florida Public Archaeology Network (FPAN).

== Early life ==
Bense was born in New Jersey, but grew up in Panama City, Florida, where she lived on her family's dairy farm with both parents and two brothers. By the time she was eight, she knew she wanted to be an archaeologist, a decision heavily influenced by family trips to historical state parks. She attended Panama City's Bay High School and graduated in 1963.

== Education ==
Bense graduated from Florida State University (FSU) with a bachelor's degree in anthropology in 1967. She then went on to receive her master's in anthropology with a focus on archaeology from this institution in 1969. Her master's thesis research, working with David S. Phelps, focused on a Late Woodland shell ring located in Wakulla County, Florida. After graduating from FSU in 1969, Bense took a job in cultural resource management working for the Florida Division of Archives, History, and Records Management on the Interstate 10 survey. Later that same year, Bense went on to receive her Ph.D. in anthropology from Washington State University (WSU) in 1972. At WSU, Bense worked with archaeologist Richard Daugherty and her advisor Frank C. Leonhardy. Her dissertation research focused on prehistoric climate change along the lower Snake River. In 1972, Bense graduated and moved back to Florida to help take care of her family in the light of both her parents' deaths, her father in 1967 and her mother in 1972.

== Early career ==
Bense spent the next five years focusing on business endeavors related to her family's north Florida farm. In 1977, she began teaching anthropology and archaeology classes at UWF. She taught an archaeology field school at Kings Point site, St. Andrews Bay, Florida. This was the first field school taught by UWF. Next, Bense headed the cultural resource reconnaissance of the St. Marks National Wildlife Refuge on the Florida Gulf Coast from 1977–1978. This project was immediately followed by a mitigation project in Mobile, Alabama, and a testing project along the Tennessee-Tombigbee Waterway, Mississippi. The last project led her to be appointed as a senior research archaeologist for the Office of Archaeological Research at the University of Alabama. In this position, she managed numerous large projects.

== Career ==
Bense made a deal with UWF to bring her CRM contracts to the school if they agreed to allow her to establish an anthropology program. In 1980, Bense started the UWF anthropology department as well as a research unit, the UWF Archaeology Institute.

In 1988, she received tenure and became a full professor eight years later in 1994. In 1991, she collaborated with the UWF History department to create a master's program in historical archaeology. In 2000, she became the department chair and introduced a master's program in anthropology two years later.

In 1984, a new city hall was constructed in downtown Pensacola and, in the process, unearthed and destroyed some of the town's colonial history. Bense led a short salvage project and, in the process, recognized the importance of educating local community members and leaders about the archaeological and historical resources in their very backyard. As downtown Pensacola underwent an urban renewal, a massive urban archaeology project headed by Bense was started to preserve and detail the Spanish and British colonial history of the city.

Later that same year, Bense worked with Gulf Power on another large public archaeology program. The company was building a new headquarters on a known Middle Woodland period site and a historic African American neighborhood known as Hawkshaw. Although the company was not under obligation, Bense was able to conduct archaeological excavations for two years. The information was accessible to the public through a series of programs, publications, and exhibits. Bense and Gulf Power were awarded the National Public Service Award from the Department of the Interior for the project in 1986, making the Hawkshaw project the first archaeology venture to be bestowed this honor. Cultural resources management or public archaeology became a mainstay in Pensacola culture over the next few decades. Excavations were undertaken at the Presidio San Miguel de Panzacola, British Fort of Pensacola, the Spanish Town of Pensacola, the Spanish Presidio Santa María de Galve on the Naval Air Station, and the Presidio Isla de Santa Rosa on the Gulf Islands National Seashore.

In the early 1990s, the Pensacola Shipwreck Survey was conducted for the Bureau of Archaeological Research (BAR) and uncovered a 16th-century Spanish shipwreck, named the Emanuel Point, off the shoreline. In 1997, BAR and UWF Anthropology partnered to finish the excavation. Following this, Bense decided that underwater archaeology needed to be incorporated into the UWF curriculum. She felt strongly that underwater resources in the area required equal attention. In 1999, UWF began excavating the remains of a frigate and flagship of the Spanish Windward Fleet named the Rosario.

In 2004, Bense worked alongside other CRM professionals and public archaeologists to write the legislature and obtain funding to start the Florida Public Archaeology Network (FPAN)

When Bense began doing public archaeology within both the Pensacola community and the broader state of Florida, she recognized that the information could be distributed in multiple ways to the public. She started a radio show through the UWF NPR channel called Unearthing Pensacola. The show has now morphed and discusses more broadly Florida historical archaeology and is produced under the name Unearthing Florida

== Other activities ==
Bense served from 1984-1999 on the Governmental Affairs Committee of the Society of American Archaeology's (SAA); as the conference chair for the Southeastern Archaeological Conference in 1984 and 1999 and their board of directors from 1980-1985 and 1997-1999; vice president of the Florida Anthropological Society from 1992-1993; from 1995-1997 on the Florida Archaeological Council's board of directors; chair of the Stewards of Heritage Awards Committee from 1994-1995; and on the Florida Archaeological Week Committee in 1993.

Bense was appointed interim president of the University of West Florida in 2008 and served until 2016. She was not only the first woman president of the college but also the first anthropologist to become the president of a public university in the US. She had taken her approach of involving the community in archaeology to her position as president in which she has sought to involve and embed the UWF community within the community of Pensacola. During her time as president, she secured a grant to fund and establish a football program at the school.

== Awards ==
- Award of Merit, from the Society for Historical Archaeology in 2002.
- Distinguished Teaching Award from the University of West Florida in 2001.
- Presidential Award, by the Society for American Archaeology for Leadership in Government Affairs in 1999.
- Ripley P. Bullen Award in 1998.
- National History Award Medal, from the Daughters of the American Revolution in 1996.
