= Lind Coulee Archaeological Site =

- U.S. National Register of Historic Places
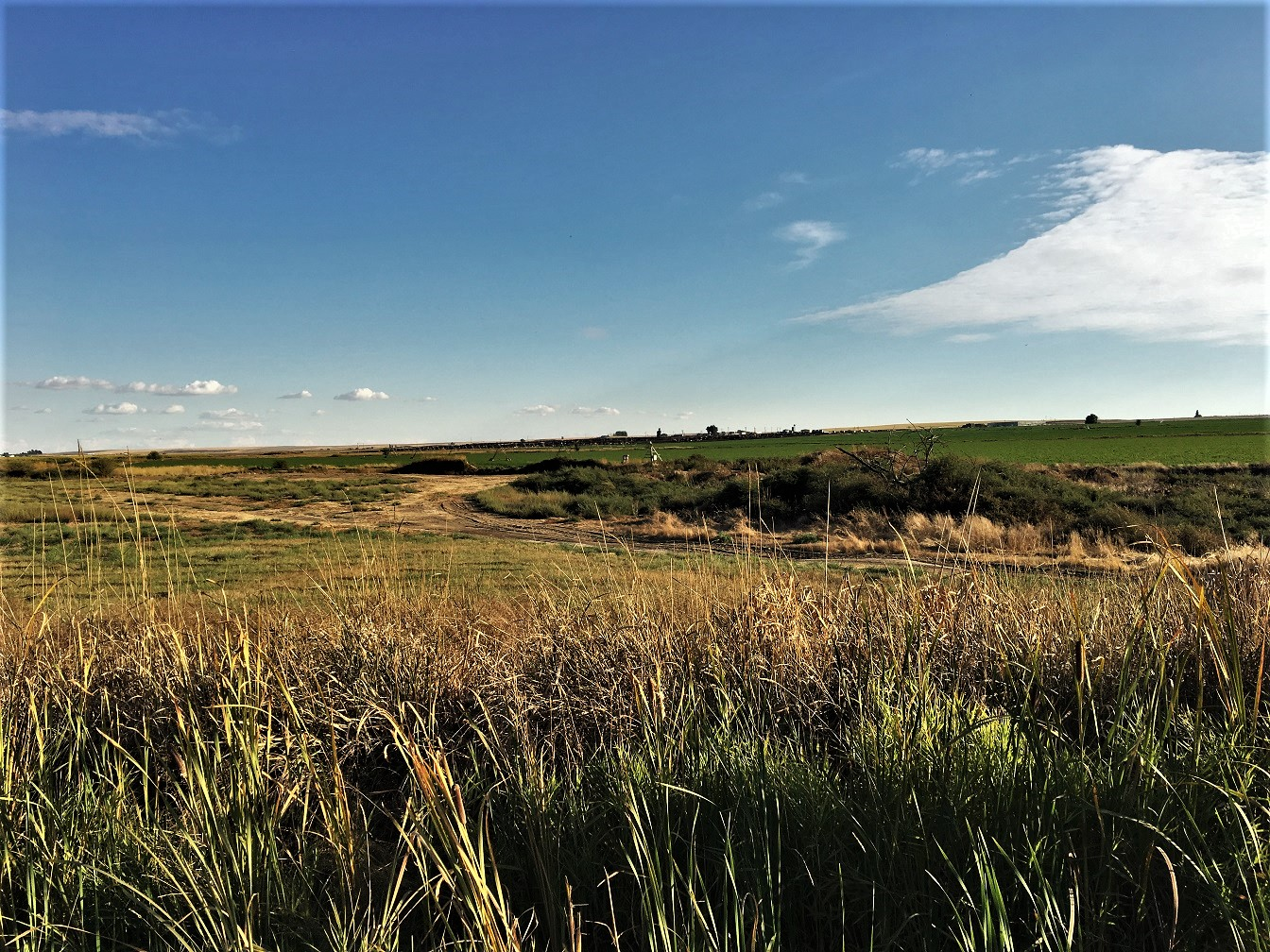
- Nearby countryside
- Nearest city: Warden, Washington
- NRHP reference No.: 74001953
- Added to NRHP: January 21, 1974

The Lind Coulee Archaeological Site, also known as 45GR97, is the site of an archaeological dig near Warden, Washington. It dates to c. 11,000 cal BP.

== History of research ==
When it was first discovered in 1947, the site was seen as the first evidence of human habitation of Washington older than about 2,000–4,000 years. It was discovered by the River Basin Surveys program of the Smithsonian Institution. Richard Daugherty (then a graduate student at the University of Washington) was informed of the existence of bones and stone tools about 14 feet (4.3 m) underground, and he began visiting the site in 1948.

From 1950 to 1951, Daugherty was director of excavation at the site. During this excavation, Daugherty made the first definite link (dating to between 7450 B.C.E. and 6568 BCE) between human tools in the Columbia Basin and extinct bison remains. These digs also found stone palettes used for grinding red ochre, the first time that items such as this had been found in Washington.

While the dates originally given to items at the site were acquired through radiocarbon dating, a bone from the site was tested with accelerator mass spectrometry in 2003, and gave a new date of between 10,550 and 11,290 years old.

In 1968, excavation was resumed, at times by Roald H. Fryxell. The site had been dry when first discovered, but it was feared that the site would be damaged by runoff from agricultural irrigation. This dig lasted until 1972. Work was primarily directed towards recording the sedimentary stratigraphy at the site in relation to the cultural deposits. Based on this new information it is believed that the site was occupied by humans more than half a dozen times, over a period of 10–150 years, but that it was mainly a spring camp, due to the preponderance of remains of young bison and unborn elk.

== Artifacts ==
Artifacts recovered included a large number of bone tools, including nearly two dozen bone needles, and bone points. The distinctive chipped stone points found are classified into three tyes of points, Lind Coulee Type 1, 2 and 3. (https://www.projectilepoints.net/Points/Lind_Coulee.html) Which is believed to precede the Clovis Point. Also, a wide variety of cutting and scraping stone tools were found that illustrate sophisticated proficiency in working stone.

Lind Coulee points are classified as part of the broader Western Stemmed Tradition known across western North America during this time.

== See also ==
- Paisley Caves

== Sources ==
- Gibbon, Guy E; Ames, Kenneth M. (1998). Archaeology of Prehistoric Native America, Taylor & Francis.
- Kirk, Ruth; Daugherty, Richard D. (2007). Archaeology in Washington, University of Washington Press.
