= Golitsyn (crater) =

Crater on the Moon

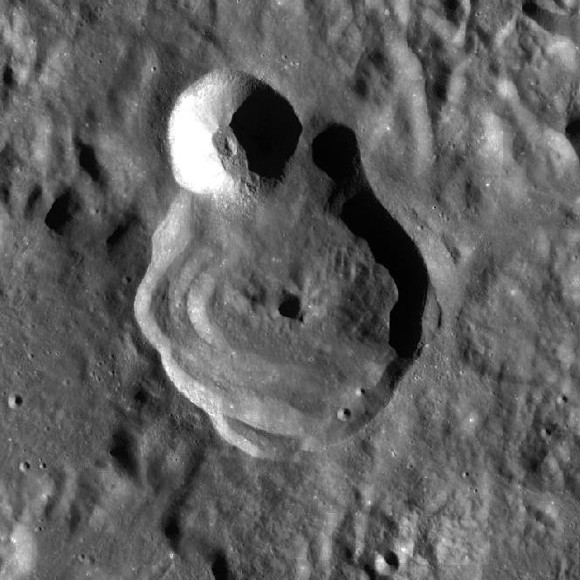
- LRO WAC image
- Coordinates: 25.1°S 105.0°W
- Diameter: 36 km
- Depth: 1762 m
- Colongitude: 105° at sunrise
- Eponym: Boris B. Golitsyn

Golitsyn is a lunar impact crater that lies beyond the western limb on the far side of the Moon. It is located in the southwestern portion of the Montes Rook mountain range that forms one of the rings around the Mare Orientale impact site. The crater is situated in the midst of rugged, irregular terrain that contains only a handful of other significant craters. The crater is named after Boris Borisovich Golitsyn, one of the founders of modern seismology.

The rim of Golitsyn is circular but irregular, and a smaller crater lies across the north-northwestern rim. The edge of the rim is sharp, and the material along narrow inner wall has slumped down to form mounds along the base. The interior floor has no impacts or features of note. The maximum depth of the crater is 1762 m.

== Satellite craters ==
By convention these features are identified on lunar maps by placing the letter on the side of the crater midpoint that is closest to Golitsyn.

Golitsyn	Latitude	Longitude	Diameter
J	27.6° S	103.0° W	20 km

The following crater has been renamed by the IAU.

- Golitsyn B — See Fryxell.
