= Wana the Bear v. Community Construction =

Wana the Bear v. Community Construction (1982) was a court case decision by the California Court of Appeals that upheld the non-protected status of Native American burial grounds. The decision effectively allowed for the continued mass desecration of Native American burial sites, including looting, since they were not legally protected as cemeteries. The case is often referred to as a display of ethnocentrism in legal decisions.

In 1990, U.S. Congress passed the Native American Graves Protection and Repatriation Act, which effectively ended this double standard and centuries of grave desecration, largely as a result of Native American grassroots activism.

== Background ==
In 1979, the case was initiated after a housing development in Stockton, California, began bulldozing a Miwok burial ground, unearthing the ancestral remains of two hundred people. The site had at once contained the remains of over 600 people. As the number of people unearthed grew, Wana the Bear, a descendant of the people attempted to stop the mass grave desecration and removal by citing California's 1854 statute on cemeteries, which protected places where "six or more human bodies buried in one place constitute a cemetery."

The issue of the case was whether this 1854 law applied to the burial grounds of Native Americans.

== Decision ==
In 1982, the California Court of Appeals sided with the commercial developers arguing that because the site had ceased being used for a period of five years or more that it was no longer considered a cemetery.

=== Criticism ===
The decision has been heavily criticized by Indigenous people, who note that the court failed to take into account that the cessation in using burial grounds for a period of five years or more was involuntary, since Indigenous peoples of California throughout the state were driven away from their homelands by settlers during the gold rush and California Genocide.

The decision has been referred to as a double standard, since "non-Indian graves have never been treated in such a manner anywhere in the United States." The decision was criticized as heavily ethnocentric and is often discussed in relation to other similar decisions against native people at the time, including State v. Glass which upheld that Indigenous remains were not protected under a statue against grave robbing in Ohio and Carter v. City of Zanesville which upheld that a cemetery was considered abandoned if use ceased.

=== Implications ===
The decision allowed hundreds of thousands of Native American human bodies to be unearthed and removed from sites, often for residential and commercial development.

== Later developments ==
In 1990, U.S. Congress passed the Native American Graves Protection and Repatriation Act, which, in theory, effectively ended this double standard that Wana the Bear v. Community Construction upheld, although the burden of proof to demonstrate connection still falls on native people, which is often difficult when sites have already been desecrated and artifacts have been removed or stolen.

In California, Assembly Bill 275: Cultural Preservation (AB 275) was passed in 2020 that attempted to extend protections to some non-federally recognized tribes. This development was received controversially by some tribes, some of whom argued that it perpetuated genocide.
