= Michael Rowlands =

British anthropologist and academic (1944–2025)

Michael John Rowlands (1944 – 19 July 2025) was a British academic and anthropologist. He was Professor of Anthropology and Material Culture at University College London from 1993 to 2010.

== Career ==
Rowlands graduated from University College London with a BSc in anthropology in 1966 and went on to do an MPhil and then a PhD at the Institute of Archaeology London. His thesis on 'A study of the bronze working industries of the Middle Bronze Age in Southern Britain' was completed in 1973. After his PhD he became dissatisfied with archaeology and turned to anthropology. He was appointed Lecturer in Anthropology at University College London (UCL) in 1973 and was promoted to a readership in 1982, after which he was Professor of Anthropology and Material Culture at UCL from 1993 to 2010. He was also Head of the Department of Anthropology there from 1992 to 1996. After retiring in 2010, Rowlands was an emeritus professor and senior research fellow at UCL. He was an honorary professor at the UCL Institute of Archaeology from 2012 and visiting professor at CHS, Critical Heritage Studies in Gothenburg from 2011.

He was a founding member of the European Association of Archaeologists and the Journal of European Archaeology.

== Research ==
According to his departmental profile, Rowlands's research "include the theorisation and conceptualisation of cultural heritage and material culture".

During his academic career Rowlands combined archaeological and anthropological studies. He conducted fieldwork in both archaeology and anthropology, on ex-slave settlements in Brazil, on Bronze Age settlements in Jutland and ethnographic studies in Cameroon and the study of heritage in China.

== Publications ==
- (Edited with Janet Friedman) The Evolution of Social Systems (Duckworth, 1977).
- (Edited with Colin Renfrew and Barbara Segraves) Theory and Explanation in Archaeology: The Southampton Conference (Academic Press, 1982).
- (Edited with Mogens Larsen and Kristian Kristiansen) Centre and Periphery in the Ancient World (Cambridge University Press, 1987).
- (Edited with Daniel Miller and Christopher Tilley) Domination and Resistance (Allen and Unwin, 1989).
- (Co-authored with Daniel Miller, Nigel Thrift, Beverly Holbrook and Peter Jackson) Shopping, Place and Identity (Routledge, 1998).
- (Co-authored Kristian Kristiansen) Social Transformations in Archaeology: Global and Local Perspectives (Routledge, 1998).
- (Co-edited with Christopher Tilley, Webb Keane, Susanne Küchler and Patricia Spyer) Handbook of Material Culture (Sage, 2006).
- (Co-edited with Ferdinand de Jong) Reclaiming Heritage (Left Coast Press, 2007).
