= Martha Dunagin Saunders =

American professor and academic official

6th President of the University of West Florida
- In office January 1, 2017 – May 12, 2025
- Preceded by: Judith A. Bense
- Succeeded by: Manny Díaz Jr.

9th President of The University of Southern Mississippi
- In office May 21, 2007 – July 1, 2012
- Preceded by: Shelby F. Thames
- Succeeded by: Aubrey K. Lucas (interim); Rodney D. Bennett

14th Chancellor of the University of Wisconsin-Whitewater
- In office August 1, 2005 – May 20, 2007
- Preceded by: Jack Miller
- Succeeded by: Richard J. Telfer

Personal details
- Education: University of Southern Mississippi (B.A.); University of Georgia (M.A.); Florida State University (Ph.D.)

Academic background
- Thesis: Eastern's pilot rebellion: Patterns of conflict rhetoric preceding the 1989 pilot walkout at Eastern Airlines (1990)
- Doctoral advisor: Theodore Clevenger

Academic work
- Discipline: communication
- Institutions: Columbus State University; University of Wisconsin-Whitewater; The University of Southern Mississippi; University of West Florida

Martha Dunagin Saunders is an American professor and academic official. She served as the 14th chancellor of the University of Wisconsin-Whitewater and the ninth president of the University of Southern Mississippi. She was also the sixth president of the University of West Florida, from 2017 until her resignation in 2025.

== Early life and education ==
Saunders was born in Hattiesburg, Mississippi, and earned Bachelor of Arts in French from the University of Southern Mississippi in 1969. She later completed a Master of Arts in journalism at the University of Georgia and a Doctor of Philosophy in communication theory and research at Florida State University in 1990.

== Career ==
On May 21, 2005, the University of Wisconsin Board of Regents' Special Committee for the UW-Whitewater Chancellor Search recommended Saunders for the position of chancellor. In June 2005, the UW-Whitewater Chancellor Search Committee voted unanimously to appoint her as the 14th chancellor of the university. She became the first female chancellor at UW-Whitewater, with her term officially beginning on August 1, 2007.

Saunders served as the ninth president of the University of Southern Mississippi and was the institution's first female president. During her tenure, the university experienced record enrollment, all-time-high fundraising and increased national recognition. She oversaw $250 million in building projects in five years. A 22-foot-tall, bronze golden eagle statue on the USM campus was dedicated in her honor in 2013.

Saunders was a professor of communication at the University of West Florida from 1984 to 2002. In 2013, she returned to the university as provost. In September 2016, the board of trustees voted for her to be the new president at the University of West Florida upon the retirement of Judith A. Bense.

Saunders was inaugurated as the sixth president of the University of West Florida on April 21, 2017. Prior to her appointment, she served as executive vice president, assuming the role of chief operating officer and chief academic officer, as well as vice president for the Division of Academic Affairs. On May 12, 2025, after eight years as president, Saunders announced her resignation.

According to the Pensacola News Journal, the announcement followed Florida governor Ron DeSantis' appointment of five new members to the UWF Board of Trustees, which prompted debate at the university.

During her presidency, the University of West Florida appeared in national rankings, including recognition by U.S. News & World Report as a regional public institution in the South for multiple years. The university was also listed several times in surveys conducted by ModernThink and the Chronicle of Higher Education regarding workplace environment. In 2024, it was named a "Great College to Work For" for the twelfth time.

== Awards and recognition ==
Saunders received several awards and recognitions, including:

- 50 Top Business Women in Mississippi, Class of 2012
- National Stevie Award for Women in Business, 2011
- National Silver Anvil Award, Public Relations Society of America, 2011
- Carnegie Community Engagement Classification, 2011
- Alumni Hall of Fame, University of Southern Mississippi, 2010
- The Hub Award (City of Hattiesburg), 2010
- Chi Omega Fraternity, Roselyn Dabbs Outstanding Alumna, 2008
- Woman of Excellence Award, Diabetes Foundation of MS, Inc., 2008
- National Silver Anvil Award, Public Relations Society of America, 1994
- University of West Florida Distinguished Service Award, 1996
- Florida Teaching Incentive Program (TIP) Award, 1994
- Invited faculty, the Florida State University's London Study Center, fall semesters 1992 and 1993
- Outstanding Undergraduate Teaching and Advising Award, University of West Florida, 1992.
- Distinguished Teaching Award, University of West Florida, 1992
- Golden Apple Award for Teaching Excellence, Escambia County Foundation for Excellence, 1991

== Personal life ==
Saunders is married to Joseph Bailey.
