= Boris Borisovich Golitsyn =

Russian physicist (1862–1916)

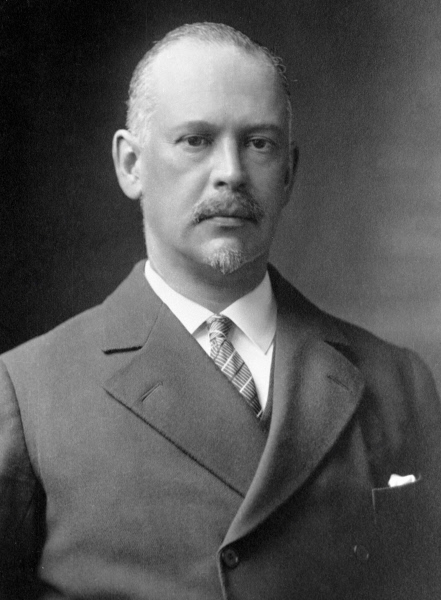
- Born: 18 February 1862; Saint Petersburg, Russia
- Died: 4 May 1916 (aged 54); Saint Petersburg, Russia
- Education: Naval Cadet Corps; University of Strasbourg
- Scientific career
- Fields: Seismology
- Workplaces: Imperial Moscow University

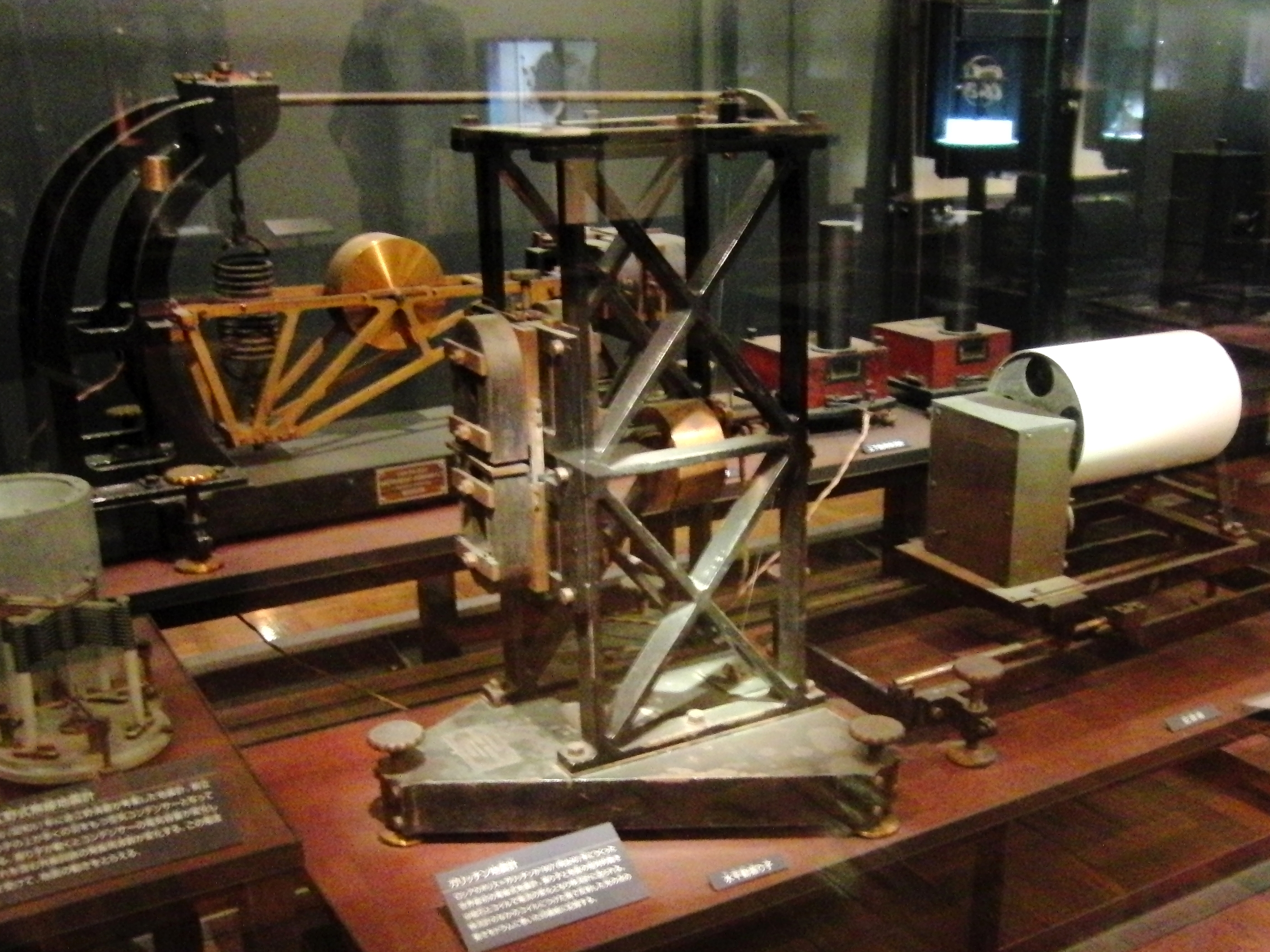
Golitsyn seismograph at the National Museum of Nature and Science, Tokyo, Japan

Prince Boris Borisovich Golitsyn (Russian: Борис Борисович Голицын, 2 March [O.S. 18 February] 1862 – 17 May [O.S. 4 May] 1916) was a prominent Russian Empire physicist who invented the first electromagnetic seismograph in 1906. He was one of the founders of modern seismology. In 1911 he was chosen to be the president of the International Seismology Association.

He was a plenary speaker on the International Congress of mathematicians in Cambridge 1912, and in 1916 was elected as member of the Royal Society. The crater Golitsyn on the far side of the Moon was named in his honour. He belonged to the Golitsyn family, one of the leading noble houses of Imperial Russia.
