= Fryxell (crater) =

Crater on the Moon

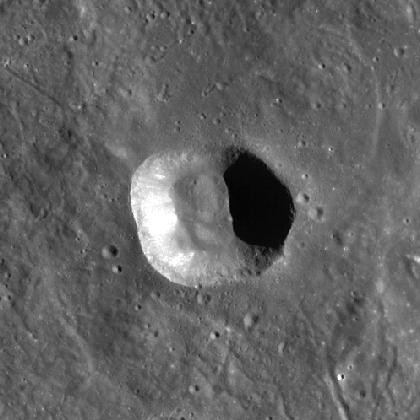
- LRO WAC image
- Coordinates: 21.3°S 101.4°W
- Diameter: 17.62 km (10.95 mi)
- Depth: Unknown
- Colongitude: 102° at sunrise
- Eponym: Roald H. Fryxell

Fryxell is a small lunar impact crater that lies amidst the western inner ring of the Montes Rook. This formation is roughly circular, but with a slightly polygonal appearance. It is a bowl-shaped formation with a darker interior floor that is relatively featureless. The inner walls of Fryxell have a higher albedo than the surrounding terrain, and so appear relatively bright. The infrared spectrum of pure crystalline plagioclase has been identified on the east and southeast wall.

The crater is named for American geologist Roald H. Fryxell (1934–1974). It was previously designated Golitsyn B, a satellite of Golitsyn, before its present designation was adopted by the International Astronomical Union in 1985.
