= Upper Saratown =

Archaeological site in North Carolina

Upper Saratown, also known as Upper Sauratown, is an archaeological site from the Late Saratown phase in North Carolina. The site is located on the Dan River in Stokes County and was occupied by the Sara people. Excavations were conducted at the site each summer from 1972 through 1981 by archaeologists from the Research Laboratories of Anthropology at the University of North Carolina. Of all the Late Saratown sites, it is the most thoroughly excavated.

== Original Inhabitants ==
The Sara Indians moved to the Dan River drainage within the Piedmont region around 1000 A.D. They occupied the village of Upper Saratown during the first half of the Late Saratown phase (also known as the Late Contact period), between A.D. 1670–1710. The Sara were thought to be Catawban-speaking people and a census in 1715 put their population at one hundred forty men and three hundred seventy women and children. However, these numbers most likely came from sources other than the tribe itself. The Sara was a group whose authority was in the hands of town councils instead of chiefs. Harmony and balance were an important part of their worldview. They participated in an event where the main focus was restoring balance called the busk, or green corn ceremony. When it was time to collect new maize, house foundations were cleaned and old or worn items, such as clothing or pottery, were done away with. The busk most likely began before the Contact period but the Sara celebrated world renewal by feasting, relighting the sacred fire, and participating in other rituals. Busks during the Contact period tended to focus on bringing the community together as a single unit. The physical layout of the community was made up of circular houses, which could be inhabited by up to two hundred to two hundred fifty people at once, within a single, stockaded village. However, community patterns changed by the end of the seventeenth century and communities began to consist of widely dispersed households. The Sara used bows, made from locustwood, and arrows, made from river cane, for any and all hunting that they did and worshiped a main god as well as a number of smaller deities. Evidence from the pottery also seems to suggest that other neighboring tribes might have joined up with the Saura at the Wiliam Kluttz site and formed a diverse community.

== Upper Saratown Pottery ==
Pottery from Upper Saratown is called the Oldtown series. The Oldtown series is a combination of Late Saratown pottery from Upper Saratown and the William Kluttz site Characteristics of the Oldtown pottery include a paste that would have been tempered with sand and if touched, would have felt smooth. The interiors of most vessels were mostly smooth. However, burnished pottery would have been burnished inside and out. Sherds were most often between four and eight mm thick and vessels shaped like a restricted neck jar were the most common form found at Upper Saratown. Most exterior vessel surfaces were smoothed and burnished, followed by net impressing. Most pots from the Late Saratown phase were large and used mainly for either cooking or storage. Also found, typically embellished with incised lines and punctuations, were cazuela and hemispherical bowls. A large quantity of big potsherds that were pieces of larger vessels were discovered and the evidence seemed to suggest that these large vessels were purposely smashed. Miniature vessels were also found in pits that had more than one use. Since these small vessels typically were included in a burial context, it seems likely that these vessels were destroyed in a community event that took place in a time of death and social disruption.

== Roasting Pits, Diet, and Domestic Assemblages ==
Late Saratown occupations at Upper Saratown were characterized by large roasting pits or earth ovens. They were usually three feet deep and across and filled with food remains and other domestic refuse. Typically, these features were close to the stockades near the edge of the village and were thought to be used to prepare enormous quantities of food for ritual celebrations. Basic subsistence was an equal share of wild and domestic food resources. There is no proof that animals from Europe played any part in subsistence during the Contact period. Maize, frequently thought to be part of the life of Southeastern tribes, was unevenly distributed but definitely plentiful and a part of the life of the Sara. The majority of the grain was left to dry and stored so that it lasted for a long time. It could have been used in stews, bread, or used for fuel. Beans were also abundant but poorly preserved archaeologically. Squashes and gourds could have been added to soups and stews and were often modified into containers and dippers. Seeds, such as sunflower and sumpweed, were also present in samples from Upper Saratown. They were usually mashed up and added to stews or bread. The most bountiful seeds were peach pits. The Spanish brought the fruit into Florida in the sixteenth century and it was quickly adopted, even by those who had no interaction with Europeans. It was assumed that the plant was native to the Carolinas by the mid seventeenth century. Watermelon seeds were also introduced in a similar way. Seeds from grapes, persimmons, and maypops were also discovered at Upper Saratown. The growing season extended into the early fall and was long enough so that the crops could have been staggered. Though the Sara were mainly an agricultural people, they also made good use of wild nuts. Nuts were usually collected in the fall and served as additions to other foods in the winter. Hazelnuts ripened quickly while acorns and hickories took more time to ripen. Hazelnuts and acorns had to be gathered as soon as they hit the ground since they were a favorite for many of the local, indigenous animal species. Hickories had protective shells which allowed them to be gathered in a more leisurely fashion. The domestic assemblage from Upper Saratown was made up mostly of maize and nuts. Fruits made up the next highest part of the assemblage while beans and various seeds made up the smallest part. During the Contact Era, the Sara worked to maintain their identity by sticking to familiar foods and keeping the domestic food assemblage relatively unchanged.

== Trade ==
Prior to the Late Saratown phase, trade was limited to native intermediaries who only swapped goods within trade networks. The lack of exposure to Europeans made the Saura unprepared for introduced diseases following contact. However by 1670, traders from Virginia started journeying out into the country in search of new markets so the Sara experienced a huge rise in English-made items. They provided English traders with pelts and in return, received goods such as copper bells, tools, guns, and glass beads. However, because the Occaneechi tribe was in a dominant position over the Saura, controlled access to firearms and used intimidation tactics, they had the power to determine which items actually reached the Sara so archaeologists found the items more commonly identified as artistic media such as the beads and bells and not so much in the way of tools and weapons.

== Diseases, Death and Mortuary Patterns ==
Mortuary patterns, like community patterns, changed drastically during the Late Saratown phase. At Upper Saratown, graves were deep shaft-and-chamber pits and placed in close proximity to houses. The bodies of the deceased were typically found in flexed positions and with ornaments manufactured by Europeans, such as glass beads or copper trinkets. However, toward the end of the Late Saratown phase, tribes were becoming more aware of their susceptibleness to foreign microbes and isolating the dead in a cemetery became a necessity. Subadults became the primary group of dead, which could have meant that their deaths were the effect of a single epidemic. Individuals who survived earlier epidemics would have built up immunities, making them less vulnerable to new European diseases. There is also evidence that shows that the dead were buried in even the most serious of epidemics. Diseases such as smallpox, measles, and other viral plagues proved to be especially deadly to the Sara because they lacked the resistance to fight them off. This was further accelerated by the movements of the growing population and intertribal contact, due to economic and political changes brought on by trade. The diseases essentially killed and disabled thousands of the Sara and by the late seventeenth century, Upper Saratown was basically destroyed. At Upper Saratown, the number of graves was so great that archaeologists could not dig standard, 10’ square excavation pits without encountering graves underneath. Of course, some deaths could have also been because of raids by Northern Seneca groups who wanted to get in on the trading of pelts and were searching for slaves. The toll on the village due to the diseases and Seneca attacks caused the Sara to go south to join up with the Catawba tribe. Deaths of individuals in the tribe, whether they were family or not, tended to disrupt the balance that the Sara so highly valued. Rituals went on for several days so people could mourn in their own way. Typically, the person was buried with some of their worldly goods. Items were also given out after the funeral and a banquet for the whole community was prepared by the women related to the dead individual. The mortuary pattern changes could also have been due to their increased urge to keep balance. By changing how they took care of their dead, the Sara might have been trying to reach a certain level of ritual purity by coming up with a definite way to separate the dead individuals from the living.

== Beginning of Excavations and NAGPRA ==
In 1972, two archaeologists from the University of North Carolina’s Research Laboratories of Anthropology, Bennie Keel and Keith Egloff, along with a field crew, began excavations in Upper Sauratown after a local teenager discovered the grave of a Sara woman, later called “Sauratown Woman” or “Sara.” Sara burials were particularly rich in grave offerings and the archaeologists wanted to preserve them as much as possible. The excavations took place every summer until August 1981. Excavations of Upper Sauratown have uncovered hundreds of human burials and pit features as well as numerous house patterns and palisades. The remains of one hundred and five individuals were removed from the site during the summer excavations. A large number of objects were found with the burials that included, but were not limited to, different types of beads, animal bones, lead shot, and turtle shell. Based on the archaeological context, the burials were classified as Native American. The artifacts and location indicated that the site belonged in the Saratown phase, which was between A.D. 1450 and 1710, and was once occupied by the Sara Indians. The Sara became one tribe with the Catawba in the 18th century so the remains can be associated with the Catawba tribe of the present day.
