= Regina Fryxell =

American educator and musician

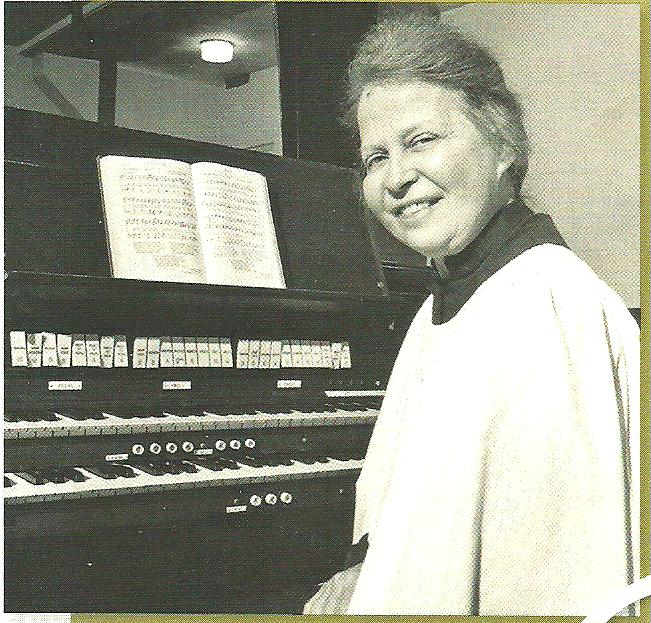
Regina Holmen Fryxell

Regina Fryxell (November 24, 1899 – September 19, 1993), born Regina Holmén, was an American educator and musician. She was most known as a popular and influential composer of Lutheran choir anthems, hymns and liturgical pieces.

== Biography ==
Regina Holmén was the daughter of Swedish born, Lutheran pastor, Johannes Algott Holmén (1859–1948) and his second wife, Amelia. She obtained two degrees simultaneously in 1922 at Augustana College, in Rock Island, Illinois, in music and English, and studied at Juilliard graduating in 1927 with a diploma in organ. She was a teacher in the music department at Augustana College, where she taught piano, organ, music theory, and French. She also taught piano and organ at Black Hawk College in Moline, and Knox College in Galesburg.

Her work was distinguished by her research into Scandinavian and German musical sources (particularly J. S. Bach) for Lutheran hymnody and liturgy, and the success with which she incorporated these sources into a form suitable for the use of modern American congregations. She was responsible for the Setting Two of the Service Book and Hymnal of the Evangelical Lutheran Church in America, on which she worked between 1948 and 1958. It was called the "Continental Setting" because it reflected the Lutheran liturgy from Northern Europe, including Sweden. Fryxell also wrote the settings of the Bach Sanctus in First Setting and the Danish Amen in Setting 2. She was also commissioned to work between 1974 and 1977 on the updated Setting Three of the successor publication, the Lutheran Book of Worship; the commissioning Inter-Lutheran Commission on Worship (ILCW) body however failed to honor the terms of the commission.

== Personal life ==
She was the wife of the geologist Fritiof Fryxell who also taught at Augustana College. The Fryxells had three sons including the geologist Roald H. Fryxell. Two of their children died at young ages. It has been noted by many musicians that this loss reflected in Regina Fryxell's music which expressed joy, and a voice of the human need.
