= Cal NAGPRA =

California law for Native American repatriation

Cal NAGPRA (Assembly Bill (978)) was an act created by the state of California which was signed into law in 2001. The act was created to implement the same repatriation expectations for state-funded institutions, museums, repositories, or collections as those federally supported through NAGPRA. Cal NAGPRA also supports non-federally recognized tribes within California that were exempt from legal rights to repatriation under the federal NAGPRA act.

== Limitation ==
Cal NAGPRA has had some limitations including insufficient enforcement and a limited scope of coverage. Increased education and outreach efforts, stronger enforcement mechanisms, and expanded coverage to include a broader range of institutions and collectors are all needed to improve the law.

Cal NAGPRA offers the ability for tribes to repatriate ancestors and objects but there are over 500 federally recognized tribes within the United States who have different views on repatriation from one another. Tribes such as the California Chumash and Eastern Shoshone are not interested in the repatriation of remains. For the California Chumash this is because the bones were removed from their original burial areas they have also lost their cultural identity.

== Changes ==
Cal NAGPRA was further amended in 2018 to include requirements for the University of California institutions to develop and implement a repatriation oversight committee that consults with the greater California Native American Heritage Commission (NAHC) to assess the U.C. systems compliance with NAGPRA and Cal NAGPRA.

In 2020, state Bill AB 275 was passed and signed to strengthen Cal NAGPRA for non-federally recognized Native American tribes in California and increase the status of tribal traditional knowledge in assessing cultural affiliation and identifying cultural artifacts. This has led to thousands of artifacts, faunal remains, and other general archaeological material (e.g., soil samples, burned seed fragments) from California museums and other repositories being broadly claimed as either "associated funerary objects" or "items of cultural patrimony," effectively preventing them from being accessed by archaeologists or students for research, in some cases permanently (e.g., reburial).

== Enhanced collaboration with California Indigenous people ==
=== Ohlone tribe ===
The Ohlone, an Indigenous people of the San Francisco Bay area, were nearly depopulated by Spanish colonial oppression and have been previously erroneously defined as extinct. The Muwekma Ohlone Tribe, a previously federally recognized tribe for Ohlone descendants, has sought reinstatement of their federal recognition as a Native American tribe. The introduction of Cal NAGPRA prompted interaction between the Muwekma Ohlone Tribe and archaeologists, and Muwekma Ohlone Tribe members reconnected with the culture and spirit of their ancestors through their participation in archaeological research as well as repatriated remains.

=== Chumash Tribe ===
The California Chumash tribe has worked alongside archaeologists, such as Philip Walker with UC Santa Barbara, for three decades to accomplish the repatriation of many of their ancestors' remains. The remains are stored according to Chumash customs and buried on native Chumash land. The Chumash have also come to an agreement with scientists that they may use the remains for study under tribal-approved scientific circumstances.
