= Fritiof Fryxell =

American educator, geologist and mountain climber (1900–1986)

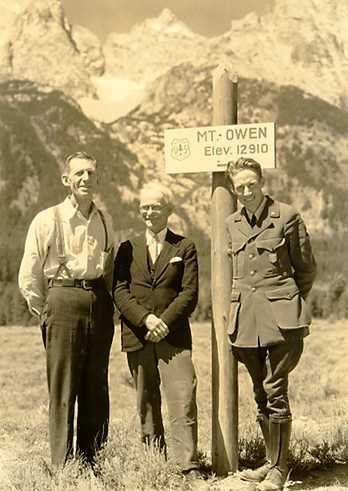
- Born: 27 April 1900
- Died: 19 December 1986 (aged 86); Rock Island
- Alma mater: University of Illinois system; University of Chicago; University of Illinois Urbana-Champaign; Augustana College
- Occupation: Mountaineer, geologist, writer, naturalist, park ranger
- Employer: Augustana College
- Children: Roald H. Fryxell
- Awards: Guggenheim Fellowship (1954)
- Branch: United States Army

Fritiof M. Fryxell (April 27, 1900 – December 19, 1986) was an American educator, geologist and mountain climber, best known for his research and writing on the Teton Range of Wyoming. Upon the establishment of Grand Teton National Park in 1929, he was named the park’s first naturalist, a position he held for six summers. He was also an accomplished biographer, publishing works on several artists and explorers of the American West.

== Early years ==
Fritiof Fryxell was born in Moline, Illinois to John and Sophie Fryxell, immigrants from Sweden. He attended Augustana College in nearby Rock Island, graduating in 1922 with majors in biology and English. He was a founding father of the Gamma Alpha Beta fraternity at Augustana College. Fryxell earned a Master's degree in English from the University of Illinois at Urbana-Champaign and then a Ph.D. in geology from the University of Chicago. His dissertation subject, mountain glaciation, took him to the West in 1924, where he fell in love with the Teton Mountains. He joined the faculty of Augustana in the fall of 1924.

== Life in the Tetons ==
Beginning in 1926, Fryxell spent the next nine summers in and around the Teton Range, which at the time was inaccessible by train or automobile. During three summers of field work for his dissertation, Fryxell spent almost all his time in Jackson Hole, the valley in the eastern lee of the Tetons, studying the moraines and glacial outwash from the mountains. He camped out, carrying his tent, rations, and down-filled sleeping bag with him as he traversed the valley floor. After his appointment as park naturalist in 1929, he was finally able to explore the mountains themselves. On his rare days off, he would rise as early as two o'clock in the morning to begin his ascent. Nearly always exploring alone, he climbed previously untraveled canyons, discovered hidden lakes, and summitted many of the range’s peaks for the first time.

During the academic year, Fryxell worked at developing a geology curriculum at Augustana. When he completed his doctoral studies in 1929, the college appointed him the first chair of the new Department of Geology. Fryxell returned to Grand Teton National Park every summer through 1934. During this time he founded the park’s museum and developed an interpretive curriculum for visitors – still finding time to blaze new trails up the mountains and log new discoveries on each trip.

== Writing ==
In 1935 Fryxell took a new summer position in Berkeley, California as geologist with the Museum Laboratories of the National Park Service. He brought with him years of notes and diaries that he had accumulated during his stays in Wyoming, and putting his degree in English to good work produced The Tetons: Interpretations of a Mountain Landscape (1938), a classic of Western nature literature that has been reprinted many times.

Over the rest of his career, Fryxell wrote several other scholarly books about the Tetons, glaciation, and topics of geological interest. In addition, he had a passion for preserving the history of the great Western explorers and artists who had spent time in the Tetons. Among his topics were mountain climber Billy Owen, artist Thomas Moran, photographer William Henry Jackson, and cartographer and geologist François E. Matthes. He also completed five volumes of Matthes's unfinished work.

== War service ==
Fritiof Fryxell served as Senior Geologist for the Philippines from 1939 to 1940. After the outbreak of World War II, while in the service of the Geological Military Unit, he played a crucial role in selecting landing sites in the South Pacific as well as Africa and Europe.

== Honors ==
- Fryxell was awarded a Guggenheim Fellowship in 1954 in the field of Earth Science.
- Lake Fryxell, a glacial lake near the coast of Antarctica, was named for Fritiof Fryxell by Professor T. L. Péwé during USN Operation Deep Freeze, in 1957-58.
- Fryxell Geology Museum at Augustana College, one of the largest sources of educational materials and specimens for students of geology, was named in his honor.

== Family ==
Fritiof Fryxell wrote a manuscript biography of his father, an immigrant from Vättlösa Parish, near Götene in southern Sweden, but never tried to publish it. After his death The Story of John Fryxell was published by the Augustana Historical Society with an introduction by Ann Boaden. Fryxell's wife, Regina Holmén Fryxell, was an organist and music teacher with a doctorate and an education from the Juilliard School. She was also on the faculty at Augustana College and accompanied him on his trips to Wyoming. Fryxell's son, Roald, was a geologist and archaeologist. One of his nephews, Paul Fryxell, was a botanist.

== Selected works ==
Fryxell, Fritiof (1928). The Physiography of the Region of Chicago. University of Chicago Press.

Fryxell, Fritiof (1929). Billy Owen and the Tetons. by University of Chicago.

Fryxell, Fritiof (1931). The Green Tree. Augustana Book Concern.

Fryxell, Fritiof (1932). The Teton Peaks and Their Ascents. The Crandall Studios.

Fryxell, Fritiof (1938). The Tetons: Interpretations of a Mountain Landscape. University of California Press.

Fryxell, Fritiof (1940). William H. Jackson: Photographer, Artist, Explorer. s.n.

Fryxell, Fritiof; Leland Horberg (1943). Alpine Mudflows in Grand Teton National Park, Wyoming. Geological Society of America.

Fryxell, Fritiof (1944). The Geology of Jackson Hole. National Parks Association.

Fryxell, Fritiof; David E Donley (1956). Memorial to François Émile Matthes (1874-1948). Geological Society of America.

Fryxell, Fritiof (1958). Thomas Moran, explorer in search of beauty: a biographical sketch. East Hampton Free Library.

Fryxell, Fritiof; François Matthes (1962). François Matthes and the marks of time: Yosemite and the High Sierra. Sierra Club.

Fryxell, Fritiof; François Matthes (1964). The Incomparable Valley: A Geologic Interpretation of the Yosemite. University of California Press.

Fryxell, Fritiof; François Matthes (1965). Glacial Reconnaissance of Sequoia National Park, California. U. S. Government Printing Office.

Fryxell, Fritiof; Phil D Smith (1978). Mountaineering in the Tetons: The Pioneer Period, 1898-1940. Teton Bookshop.

Fryxell, Fritiof (1988). Thomas Moran's Journey to the Tetons in 1879. Wildside Press.

Fryxell, Fritiof (1990). The Story of John Fryxell. Augustana Historical Society (posthumously).

Fryxell, Fritiof (2010). Ferdinand Hayden: A Young Scientist in the Great West, 1853-1855. Augustana Historical Society (posthumously).

== Related reading ==
- Runte, Alfred (2010) National Parks: The American Experience (Taylor Trade Publishing) ISBN 9781589794740
