= Native American Graves Protection and Repatriation Act =

1990 US law protecting Native American remains and artifacts

Native American Grave Protection and Repatriation Act
- Long title: An Act to provide for the protection of Native American graves, and for other purposes.
- Acronyms (colloquial): NAGPRA
- Enacted by: the 101st United States Congress
- Effective: November 16, 1990

Citations
- Public law: 101-601
- Statutes at Large: 104 Stat. 3048

Codification
- Titles amended: 25 U.S.C.: Indians
- U.S.C. sections created: 25 U.S.C. ch. 32 § 3001 et seq.

Legislative history
- Introduced in the House as H.R. 5237 by Mo Udall (D-AZ) on July 10, 1990; Committee consideration by House Interior and Insular Affairs; Passed the House on October 22, 1990 (voice vote); Passed the Senate on October 25, 1990 (voice vote) with amendment; House agreed to Senate amendment on October 27, 1990 (passed without objection); Signed into law by President George H. W. Bush on November 16, 1990

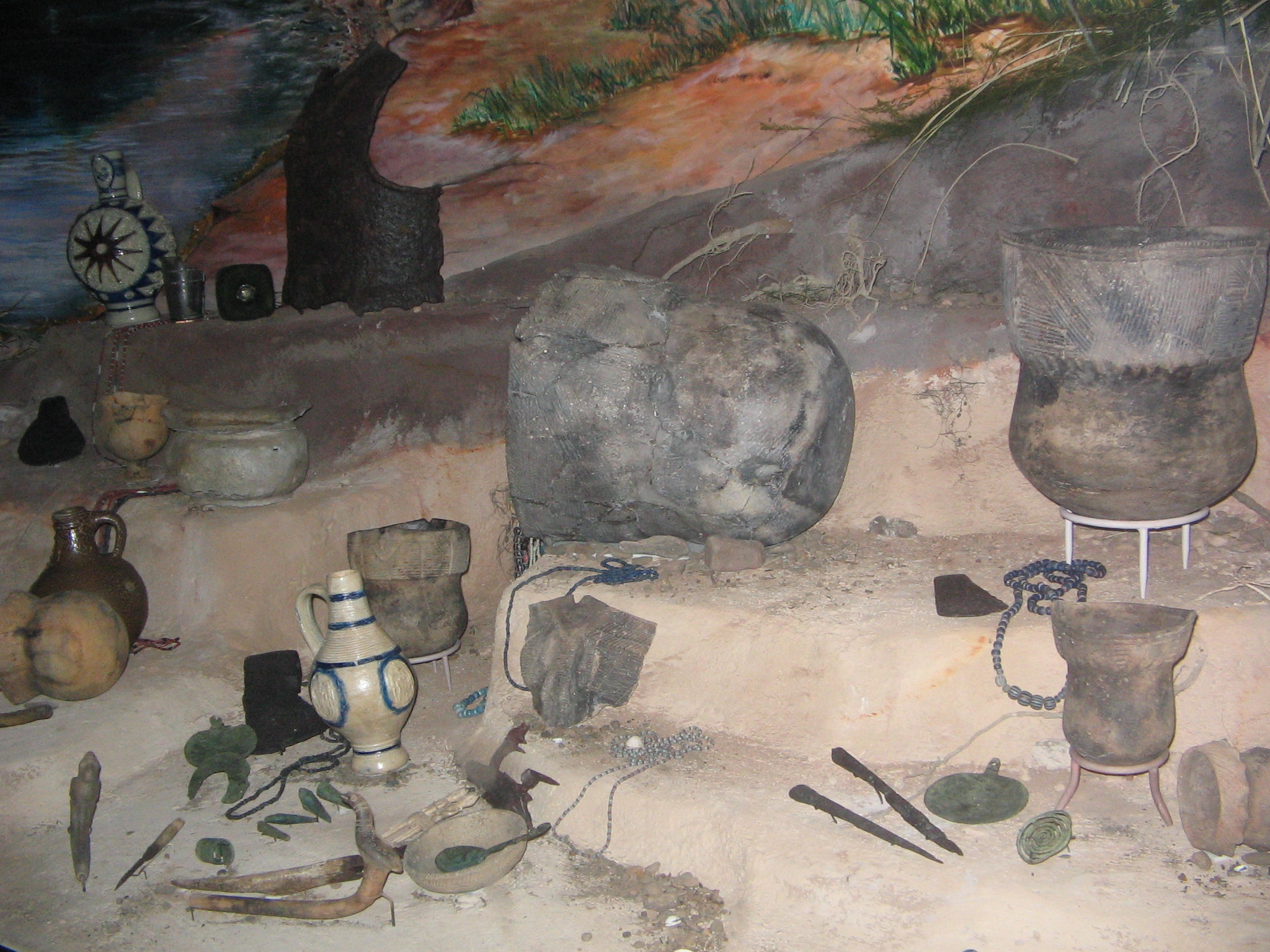
Susquehannock artifacts on display at the State Museum of Pennsylvania, 2007

The Native American Graves Protection and Repatriation Act (NAGPRA), Pub. L. 101–601, is a United States federal law enacted on November 16, 1990.

The Act includes three major sets of provisions. The "repatriation" provisions of the Act require federal agencies and institutions that receive federal funding to return Native American "cultural items" in their possession or control to lineal descendants and culturally affiliated American Indian tribes, Alaska Native villages, and Native Hawaiians organizations. Cultural items include human remains, funerary objects, sacred objects, and objects of cultural patrimony. A program of federal grants assists in the repatriation process and the Secretary of the Interior may assess civil penalties on museums that fail to comply.

NAGPRA's "disposition" provisions establish procedures for the inadvertent discovery or planned excavation of Native American cultural items on federal or tribal lands, which includes private and state lands within the exterior boundary of an Indian reservation. These provisions do not apply to discoveries or excavations on non-federal or tribal lands, but the repatriation provisions do apply to Native American cultural items if they come under the control of an institution that receives federal funding.

NAGPRA also makes it a criminal offense to traffic in Native American human remains without right of possession or in Native American cultural items obtained in violation of the Act. In the original statute penalties for a first offense could reach 12 months' imprisonment and a $100,000 fine. The statute was amended in 2022 to increase the penalty for a first conviction for trafficking Native American human remains from 12 months' imprisonment to a term of one year and one day (a felony); and for a subsequent conviction from a term of five years to ten years. An initial conviction for trafficking of Native American cultural items remains a misdemeanor (imprisonment of up to one year), but the penalty for a subsequent conviction was likewise changed from five years' imprisonment to ten years.

The Department of the Interior revised the regulations implementing NAGPRA in 2024 to clarify steps for its implementation. The revised regulations, which went into effect on January 12, 2024, state "...museums and Federal agencies must defer to the Native American traditional knowledge of lineal descendants, Indian Tribes, and Native Hawaiian organizations."

== Background ==
The intent of the NAGPRA legislation is to address long-standing claims by federally recognized tribes for the return of human remains and cultural objects unlawfully obtained from pre-contact, post-contact, former, and current Native American homelands. Interpretation of human and Indigenous rights, prehistoric presence, cultural affiliation with antiquities, and the return of remains and objects can be controversial and contested. It includes provisions that delineate the legal processes by which museums and federal agencies are required to return certain Native American cultural items—human remains, gravesite materials, and other objects of cultural patrimony—to proven lineal descendants, culturally-related Native American tribes, and Native Hawaiian groups.

Outcomes of NAGPRA repatriation efforts are slow and cumbersome, leading many tribes to spend considerable effort documenting their requests; collections' holders are obliged to inform and engage with tribes whose materials they may possess. NAGPRA was enacted primarily at the insistence and by the direction of members of Native American nations.

=== Tribal concerns ===
Tribes had many reasons based in law that made legislation concerning tribal grave protection and repatriation necessary.

- State Statutory Law: Historically, states only regulated and protected marked graves. Native American graves were often unmarked and did not receive the protection provided by these statutes.
- Common Law: The colonizing population formed much of the legal system that developed over the course of settling the United States. This law did not often take into account the unique Native American practices concerning graves and other burial practices. It did not account for government actions against Native Americans, such as removal, the relationship that Native Americans as different peoples maintain with their dead, and sacred ideas and myths related to the possession of graves.
- Equal Protection: Native Americans, as well as others, often found that the remains of Native American graves were treated differently from the dead of other races.
- First Amendment: As in most racial and social groups, Native American burial practices relate strongly to their religious beliefs and practices. They held that when tribal dead were desecrated, disturbed, or withheld from burial, their religious beliefs and practices are being infringed upon. Religious beliefs and practices are protected by the First Amendment.
- Sovereignty Rights: Native Americans hold unique rights as sovereign bodies, leading to their relations to be controlled by their own laws and customs. The relationship between the people and their dead is an internal relationship, to be understood as under the sovereign jurisdiction of the tribe.
- Treaty: From the beginning of the U.S. government and tribe relations, the tribe maintained rights unless specifically divested to the U.S. government in a treaty. The U.S. government does not have the right to disturb Native American graves or their dead, because it has not been granted by any treaty.

== Description ==
The Native American Graves Protection and Repatriation Act is a law that establishes the ownership of cultural items excavated or discovered on federal or tribal land after November 16, 1990. The act also applies to land transferred by the federal government to the states under the Water Resources Department Act. However, the provisions of the legislation do not apply to private lands. The Act states that Native American remains and associated funerary objects belong to lineal descendants. If lineal descendants cannot be identified, then those remains and objects, along with associated funerary and sacred objects, and objects of cultural patrimony belong to the tribe on whose lands the remains were found or the tribe having the closest known relationship to them. Tribes find the burden of proof is on them, if it becomes necessary to demonstrate a cultural relationship that may not be well-documented or understood. Nowhere has this issue been more pronounced than in California, where many small bands were extinguished before they could be recognized, and only a handful have obtained federal recognition as Native Americans and descendants of Native American bands.

Congress attempted to "strike a balance between the interest in scientific examination of skeletal remains and the recognition that Native Americans, like people from every culture around the world, have a religious and spiritual reverence for the remains of their ancestors."

The act also requires each federal agency, museum, or institution that receives federal funds to prepare an inventory of remains and funerary objects and a summary of sacred objects, cultural patrimony objects, and unassociated funerary objects. The act provides for repatriation of these items when requested by the appropriate descendant of the tribe. This applies to remains or objects discovered at any time, even before November 16, 1990.

Since the legislation passed, the human remains of approximately 32,000 individuals have been returned to their respective tribes. Nearly 670,000 funerary objects, 120,000 unassociated funerary objects, and 3,500 sacred objects have been returned.

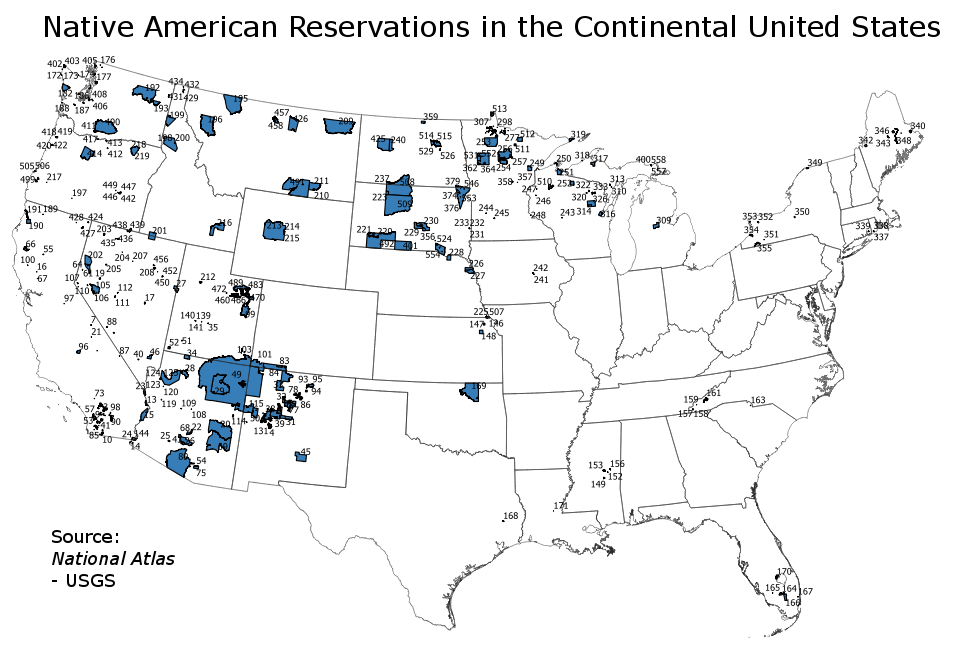
Map of Native American reservations

The statute attempts to mediate a significant tension that exists between the tribes' communal interests in the respectful treatment of their deceased ancestors and related cultural items and the scientists' individual interests in the study of those same human remains and items. The act divides the treatment of American Indian human remains, funerary objects, sacred objects, and objects of cultural patrimony into two basic categories. Under the inadvertent discovery and planned excavation component of the act and regulations, if federal officials anticipate that activities on federal and tribal lands after November 16, 1990 might have an effect on American Indian burials—or if burials are discovered during such activities—they must consult with potential lineal descendants or American Indian tribal officials as part of their compliance responsibilities. For planned excavations, consultation must occur during the planning phase of the project. For inadvertent discoveries, the regulations delineate a set of short deadlines for initiating and completing consultation. The repatriation provision, unlike the ownership provision, applies to remains or objects discovered at any time, even before the effective date of the act, whether or not discovered on tribal or federal land. The act allows archaeological teams a short time for analysis before the remains must be returned. Once it is determined that human remains are American Indian, analysis can occur only through documented consultation (on federal lands) or consent (on tribal lands).

A criminal provision of the Act prohibits trafficking in Native American human remains, or in Native American "cultural items." Under the inventory and notification provision of the act, federal agencies and institutions that receive federal funds are required to summarize their collections that may contain items subject to NAGPRA. Additionally, federal agencies and institutions must prepare inventories of human remains and funerary objects. Under the act, funerary objects are considered "associated" if they were buried as part of a burial ceremony with a set of human remains still in possession of the federal agency or other institution. "Unassociated" funerary objects are artifacts where human remains were not initially collected by—or were subsequently destroyed, lost, or no longer in possession of—the agency or institution. Consequently, this legislation also applies to many Native American artifacts, especially burial items and religious artifacts. It has necessitated mass cataloguing of the Native American collections in order to identify the living heirs, culturally affiliated Indian tribes, and Native Hawaiian organizations of remains and artifacts. NAGPRA has had a dramatic effect on the day-to-day practice of archaeology and physical anthropology in the United States. In many cases, NAGPRA helped stimulate interactions of archaeologists and museum professionals with Native Americans that were felt to be constructive by all parties.

== History ==
=== Cultural exploitation ===
The late 19th century was one of the most difficult periods in Native American history regarding the loss of cultural artifacts and land. With the founding of museums and scholarly studies of Native American peoples increasing with the growth of anthropology and archeology as disciplines, private collectors and museums competed to acquire artifacts, which many Native Americans considered ancestral assets, but others sold. This competition existed not only between museums such as the Smithsonian Institution (founded in 1846) and museums associated with universities, but also between museums in the United States and museums in Europe. In the 1880s and 1890s, collecting was done by untrained adventurers. As of the year 1990, federal agencies reported having the remains of 14,500 deceased Natives in their possession, which had accumulated since the late 19th century. Many institutions said they used the remains of Native Americans for anthropological research, to gain more information about humans. At one time, in since discredited comparative racial studies, institutions such as the Army Medical Museum sought to demonstrate racial characteristics to prove the inferiority of Native Americans.

=== Residential and commercial developments ===
Residential and commercial development was a driving force in the desecration of many Native American burial sites, particularly in the 20th century with the expansion of suburbs and urban sprawl. For example, in Wana the Bear v. Community Construction (1982), two-hundred Miwok ancestral remains were bulldozed in the development of a residential area in Stockton, California. A descendant of the people, Wana the Bear, attempted to prevent further desecration by arguing that the site should continue to be protected as a cemetery. The California Courts of Appeal sided with the construction company, which finished in its destruction of the burial grounds for residential development.

=== Maria Pearson ===
Maria Pearson is often credited with being the earliest catalyst for the passage of NAGPRA legislation; she has been called "the Founding Mother of modern Indian repatriation movement" and the "Rosa Parks of NAGPRA". In the early 1970s, Pearson was appalled that the skeletal remains of Native Americans were treated differently from white remains. Her husband, an engineer with the Iowa Department of Transportation, told her that both Native American and white remains were uncovered during road construction in Glenwood, Iowa. While the remains of 26 white burials were quickly reburied, the remains of a Native American mother and child were sent to a lab for study instead. Pearson protested to Governor Robert D. Ray, finally gaining an audience with him after sitting outside his office in traditional attire. "You can give me back my people's bones and you can quit digging them up", she responded when the governor asked what he could do for her. The ensuing controversy led to the passage of the Iowa Burials Protection Act of 1976, the first legislative act in the United States that specifically protected Native American remains.

Emboldened by her success, Pearson went on to lobby national leaders, and her efforts, combined with the work of many other activists, led to the creation of NAGPRA. Pearson and other activists were featured in the 1995 BBC documentary Bones of Contention.

=== Slack Farm and Dickson Mounds ===
The 1987 looting of a 500-year-old burial mound at the Slack Farm in Kentucky, in which human remains were tossed to the side while relics were stolen, made national news and helped to galvanize popular support for protection of Native American graves. Likewise, several protests at the Dickson Mounds site in Illinois, where numerous Indian skeletons were exposed on display, also increased national awareness of the issue.

== Challenges ==
A number of archeologists are concerned that they are being prevented from studying ancient remains which cannot be traced to any historic tribe. Many of the tribes migrated to their territories at the time of European encounter within 100–500 years from other locations, so their ancestors were not located in the historic territories. The issue has repeatedly stalled archaeological investigations, such as in the case of the Spirit Cave mummy; fears have been voiced that an anti-scientific sentiment could well have permeated politics to an extent that scientists might find their work to be continuously barred by Native Americans rights activists.

=== Kennewick Man ===
Compliance with the legislation can be complicated such as the Kennewick Man, a skeleton found on July 28, 1996 near Kennewick, Washington. The almost complete skeleton was close to 9,000 years old. Ancient remains from North America are rare, making it a valuable scientific discovery. The federally recognized Umatilla, Colville, Yakima, and Nez Perce tribes had each claimed Kennewick Man as their ancestor, and sought permission to rebury him. Kennewick, Washington is classified as part of the ancestral land of the Umatilla.

Archaeologists said that because of Kennewick Man's great age, there was insufficient evidence to connect him to modern tribes. The great age of the remains makes this discovery scientifically valuable. As archaeologists, forensic specialists, and linguists differed about whether the adult male was of Indigenous origin, the standing law, if conclusively found by a preponderance of evidence to be Native American, would give the tribe of the geographic area where he was found a claim to the remains. Anthropologists wanted to preserve and study the remains, however, steps had already been taken to repatriate the Kennewick Man given that he was discovered on federal lands. A lawsuit was filed by Douglas Owsley and Robson Bonnichsen, along with other notable anthropologists, in the hopes of preventing the repatriation of the skeleton. In 2004, the court sided with the plaintiffs' assertion that due to the skeleton's age, there was not enough information available at the time to conclude whether the Kennewick Man had any cultural or genetic ties to any present day Native American tribes, and granted the plaintiffs' request to further study the remains. New evidence could still emerge in defense of tribal claims to ancestry, but emergent evidence may require more sophisticated and precise methods of determining genetic descent, given that there was no cultural evidence accompanying the remains.

One tribe claiming ancestry to Kennewick Man offered up a DNA test, and in 2015 it was found that the Kennewick man is "more closely related to modern Native Americans than any other living population." In September 2016, the U.S. House and Senate passed legislation to return the ancient bones to a coalition of Columbia Basin tribes for reburial according to their traditions. The coalition includes the Confederated Tribes of the Colville Reservation, the Confederated Tribes and Bands of the Yakama Nation, the Nez Perce Tribe, the Confederated Tribes of the Umatilla Reservation, and the Wanapum Band of Priest Rapids. The remains were buried on February 18, 2017, with 200 members of five Columbia Basin tribes, at an undisclosed location in the area.

== Return to the Earth project ==
Return to the Earth is an inter-religious project whose goal is to inter unidentified remains in regional burial sites. Over 110,000 remains that cannot be associated with a particular tribe are held in institutions across the United States, as of 2006. The project seeks to enable a process of reconciliation between Native and non-Native peoples, construct cedar burial boxes, produce burial cloths and fund the repatriation of remains. The first of the burial sites is near the Cheyenne Cultural Center in Clinton, Oklahoma.

== Institutions with remains ==
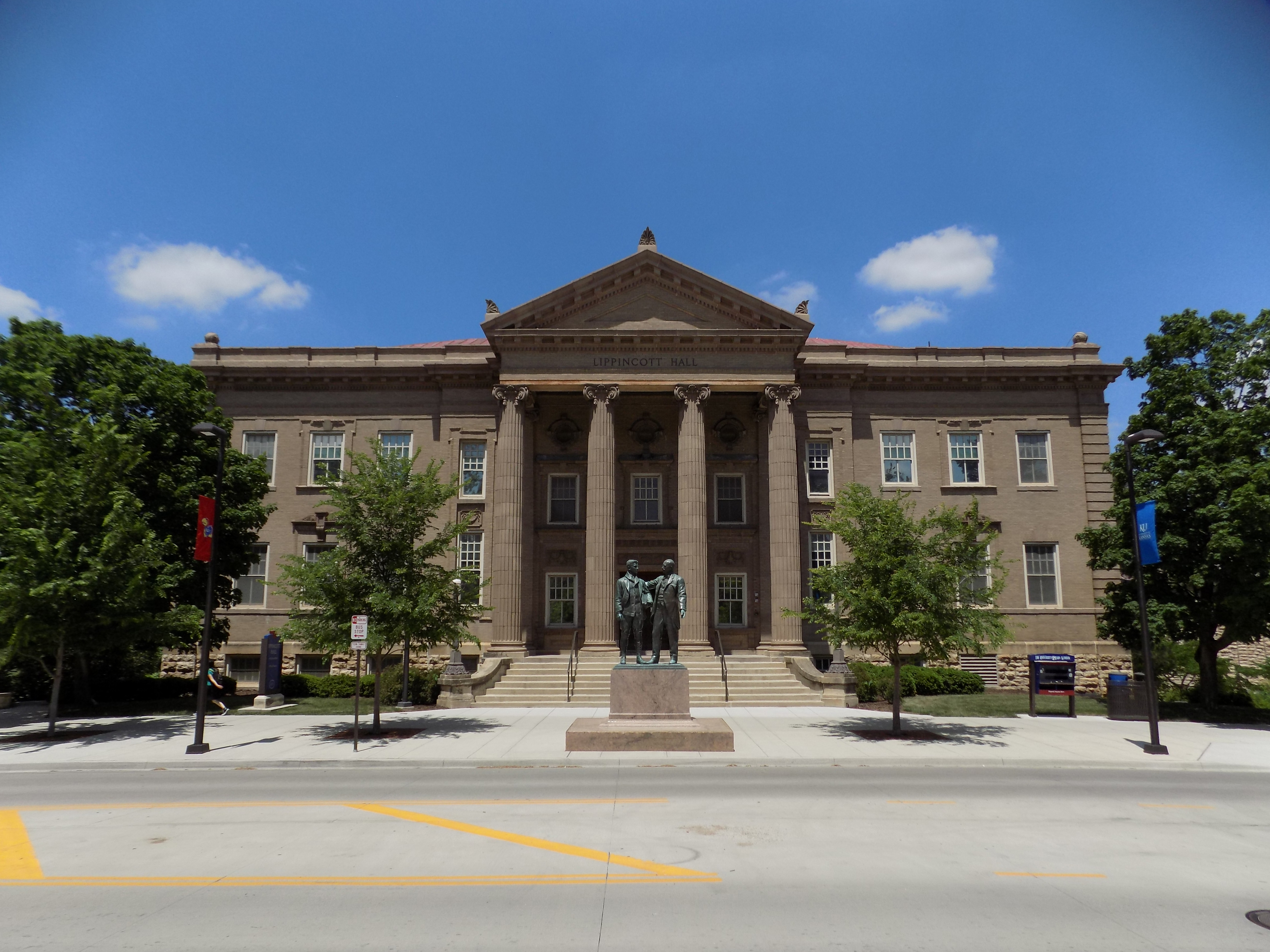
The University of Kansas announced in 2022 that remains were being stored in Lippincott Hall.

Institutions with non-repatriated remains:

- The Smithsonian National Museum of Natural History, which has more than 5000 human remains; some of these may belong to the Seminole Tribe of Florida.
- American Museum of Natural History in Manhattan, New York is estimated to hold more than 1900 remains.
- The Field Museum in Chicago is estimated to hold more than 1000 remains.
- The Ohio History Connection (previously the Ohio Historical Society) is estimated to hold more than 7100 remains.
- Harvard University's Peabody Museum of Archaeology and Ethnology is estimated to hold more than 6100 remains.
- Illinois State Museum is estimated to hold more than 7500 remains.
- Indiana University is estimated to hold more than 4800 remains.
- The Phoebe A. Hearst Museum of Anthropology at the University of California, Berkeley is estimated to hold more than 9000 remains.
- The University of Kansas holds at least 271 individuals’ remains and 539 funerary objects with almost half the remains being from Wyandotte County.
- The University of North Dakota discovered dozens of remains in collections on campus in March 2022.
- California State University System holds 5804 human remains and an additional 692,500 potential cultural items such as artifacts, animal bone, and samples on 21 of its 23 campuses.
- The South Carolina Institute of Archaeology and Anthropology has 252 ancestral remains and 9748 known funerary objects.
- The Charleston Museum in Charleston, South Carolina, has 80 remains after repatriating two.

== Related state laws ==
Cal NAGPRA (Assembly Bill (978) is an act created by the state of California which was signed into law in 2001. The act was created to implement the same repatriation expectations for state-funded institutions, museums, repositories, or collections as those federally supported through NAGPRA. Cal NAGPRA also supports non-federally recognized tribes within California that were exempt from legal rights to repatriation under the federal NAGPRA act. Institutions that receive both federal and state funding are required to comply with provisions of both NAGPRA and the applicable state law until there is a specific conflict between the two at which point the federal law generally preempts conflicting state requirements.

== International policies ==
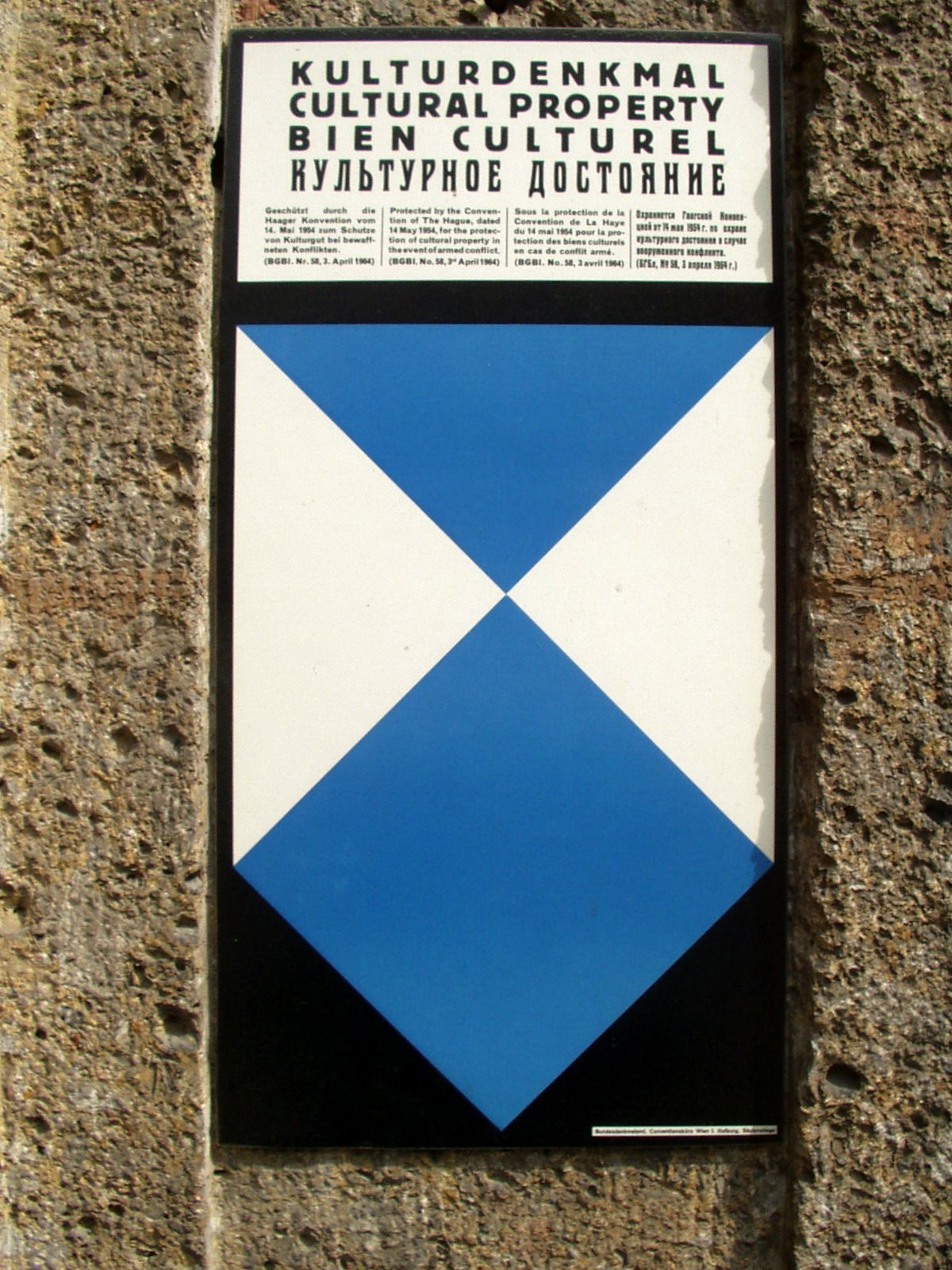
Distinctive Marking of Cultural Property, Hague Convention

The issues of such resources are being addressed by international groups dealing with Indigenous rights. For example, in 1995 the United States signed an agreement with El Salvador in order to protect all pre‑Columbian artifacts from leaving the region. Soon after, it signed similar agreements with Canada, Peru, Guatemala, and Mali and demonstrated leadership in implementing the 1970 UNESCO Convention. The UNESCO convention membership increased to 86 countries by 1997, and 193 by 2007. UNESCO appears to be reducing the illicit antiquities trade. Although difficult to track, the scholar Phyllis Messenger notes that some antiquities traders have written articles denouncing the agreements, which suggests that it is reducing items sold to them.

An international predecessor of the UNESCO Convention and NAGPRA is the 1954 Hague Convention for the Protection of Cultural Property in the Event of Armed Conflict. The Hague Convention was the first international convention to focus on preserving cultural heritage from the devastation of war. Looting and destruction of other civilizations have been characteristics of war recorded from the first accounts of all cultures.

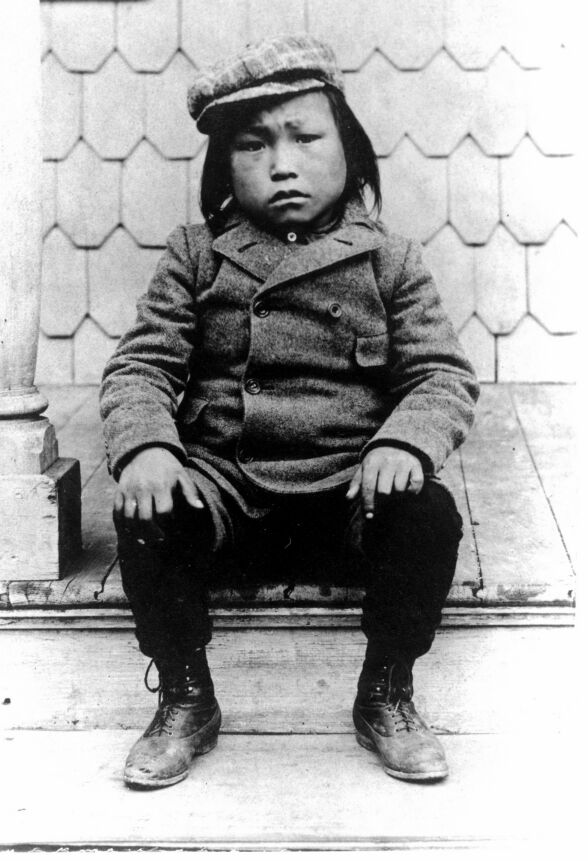
Minik Wallace (Inughuaq) in New York, 1897

On September 30, 1897, Lieutenant Robert Peary brought six Inuit from Greenland to the American Museum of Natural History in New York, at the request of the anthropologist Franz Boas, in order to "obtain leisurely certain information which will be of the greatest scientific importance" regarding Inuit culture. About two weeks after arrival at the museum, all six of the Inuit became sick with colds and fever. They began to perform their tribal healing process and were mocked for their bizarre behavior. Viewing these people became a form of entertainment for the Americans. By November 1, 1897, they were admitted to the Bellevue Hospital Center with tuberculosis, which they likely had contracted before their trip. In February, the first Inuk died, followed shortly after by two more. By the time the sickness had run its course, only two men survived. Minik was adopted by a superintendent of the museum, while Uissakassak returned to his homeland in Greenland. Later, after being lied to and being told that his father Qisuk had received a proper Inuit burial, Minik was shocked to find his father's skeleton on display in the museum.

In 1993 the museum agreed to return the four Inuit skeletons to Greenland for proper burial. Representatives of the Museum went to Greenland that year to participate. In contrast to peoples in other areas, some local Inuit thought that the burial was more desired by the Christian representatives of the museum, and that the remains could have just as appropriately been kept in New York. David Hurst Thomas' study of the case shows the complexity of reburial and repatriation cases, and the need for individual approaches to each case by all affected parties.

=== Protecting cultural property ===
In the United States, the Archaeological Resources Protection Act (ARPA) protects archaeological sites on federally owned lands. Privately owned sites are controlled by the owners. In some areas, archaeological foundations or similar organizations buy archaeological sites in order to conserve cultural resources associated with such properties.

Other countries may use three basic types of laws to protect cultural remains:

- Selective export control laws control the trade of the most important artifacts while still allowing some free trade. Countries that use these laws include Canada, Japan, and the United Kingdom.
- Total export restriction laws are used by some countries to enact an embargo and completely shut off export of cultural property. Many Latin American and Mediterranean countries use these laws.
- Other countries, such as Mexico, use national ownership laws to declare national ownership for all cultural artifacts. These laws cover control of artifacts that have not been discovered, to try to prevent looting of potential sites before exploration.

== See also ==
- American Indian Religious Freedom Act
- National Museum of the American Indian
- Tribal Historic Preservation Officer
- Visual arts by Indigenous peoples of the Americas: Cultural sensitivity and repatriation
