= Cultural resource management =

Vocation and practice

== Introduction ==
=== What is CRM ===
A general definition of cultural resource management (CRM) is the practice of managing cultural resources and heritage assets. The goal of CRM is to assess and mitigate effects of cultural resources at risk of being destroyed or are being destroyed due to construction or natural disasters. Assessments and mitigation are completed mainly through survey and documentation of archaeological and cultural sites along with community survey of impacts.

This term gained popularity and recognition by American archaeologists in the mid 1960s and early 1970s. American archaeologist wanted to shift focus to preservation through management rather than exploitation amidst ongoing environmental and conservation movements. The creation and enacting of The Archaeological and Historic Preservation Act of 1974, commonly known as the Moss-Bennett Act, helped to fuel the creation of CRM. CRM is largely defined through legislation on state, federal/national, and international levels.

The term is, "used mostly by archaeologists and much more occasionally by architectural historians and historical architects, to refer to managing historic places of archaeological, architectural, and historical interests and considering such places in compliance with environmental and historic preservation laws."

=== Cultural Resources ===
In CRM, cultural resources can be tangible or intangible. Tangible resources, or physical resources, include archaeological artifacts, buildings/structures, skylines, sites, art, and museum archives. Intangible resources, or non-physical resources, include cultural traditions, practices, knowledge, oral history, language, rituals, performances, music, and storytelling.

An example of a tangible resource protected in part due to CRM is the New York skyline. At a national and international level, cultural resource management may be concerned with larger themes, such as languages in danger of extinction, public education, the ethos or operation of multiculturalism, and promoting access to cultural resources. The Masterpieces of the Oral and Intangible Heritage of Humanity is an attempt by the United Nations to identify exemplars of intangible culture.

Although early legislation such as the 1906 Antiquities Act provided protections, it wasn't until the 1970s when the US National Park Service coined the term 'cultural resource.' According to the US National Park Service, cultural resources fall under the following categories: cultural landscapes, historic/prehistoric structures, archaeological resources, and museum collections. The National Park Service defines cultural resources as being "Physical evidence or place of past human activity: site, object, landscape, structure; or a site, structure, landscape, object or natural feature of significance to a group of people traditionally associated with it."

=== CRM vs. Heritage Management ===
Although often used interchangeably, CRM and heritage management have slight differences. CRM emphasizes legal compliance while managing these resources. Heritage management is a broader term to describe the practice of managing these resources. CRM is predominately used in the US whereas heritage management is a global broad term. Depending on the country, CRM is also commonly referred to as Contract Archaeology, Compliance Archaeology, Heritage Management (HRM), Cultural Heritage Management, Consulting Archaeology, etc.

=== Anthropology ===
Understanding the traditional cultures of all peoples is essential in mitigating the adverse impact of development and ensuring that intervention by more developed nations is not prejudicial to the interests of local people or results in the extinction of cultural resources. In order to mitigate by understanding or acting on behalf of or for communities, CRM utilizes the fields of anthropology: cultural, archaeology, biological, and linguistic.

== Policy ==
=== US Policy ===
Cultural resource management has been shaped since its introduction by both state and federal laws. Protections for cultural resources began with legislation under the Antiquities Act signed in 1906. More recent legislation includes NAGPRA (Native American Graves Protection and Repatriation Act) signed in 1990, recently updated in 2024. Key legislation used in the US in CRM today are NAGPRA, NEPA, and NHPA Section 106 consultation and 110 Reviews. Below is a simple timeline of the history of legislation in regards to cultural resource management:

- Antiquities Act of 1906
- National Stolen Property Act of 1948
- Management of Museum Properties Act of 1955
- Reservoir Salvage Act of 1960
- National Historic Preservation Act (NHPA) 1966
- The National Environmental Policy Act of 1969
- Archaeological and Historic Preservation Act of 1974 (AHPA)
  - also referred to as the Moss-Bennett Act
- Archaeological Resources Protection Act of 1979 (ARPA)
- Native American Grave Protection and Repatriation Act of 1990 (NAGPRA)

While some federal legislation directly grants protection, alternate legislation such as environmental and natural laws are utilized in CRM to grant protections. Similarly, some states go further to enshrine more protections through state legislature. Examples of state specific laws are CAL-NAGPRA and CEQA in California. Examples of laws unique to Texas include the Antiquities Code of Texas of 1969 (ACT) and Texas Health and Safety Code (THSC) Chapter 711.

==== National Register eligibility ====
In the United States, a common Cultural Resource Management task is the implementation of a Section 106 review: CRM archaeologists determine whether federally funded projects are likely to damage or destroy archaeological sites that may be eligible for the National Register of Historic Places. This process commonly entails one or more archaeological field surveys.

== Practices in CRM ==
=== Heritage Management ===
Cultural resource management in the heritage context is mainly concerned with the investigation of sites with archaeological potential, the preservation and interpretation of historic sites and artifacts, and the culture of indigenous people. The subject developed from initiatives in rescue archaeology, sensitivities to the treatment of indigenous people, and subsequent legislation to protect cultural heritage.

Current cultural resource management laws and practices in the United States addresses the following resources:

- Historic properties (as listed or eligible for the National Register of Historic Places)
- Older properties that may have cultural value, but may or may not be eligible for the National Register
- Spiritual places
- Cultural landscapes
- Archaeological sites
- Shipwrecks, submerged aircraft
- Native American graves and cultural items
- Historical documents
- Archaeological and historical artifacts
- Religious sites
- Religious practices
- Cultural use of natural resources
- Folklife, tradition, and other social institutions

A significant proportion of the archaeological investigation in countries that have heritage management legislation, including the United States and United Kingdom, is conducted on sites under threat of development. In the US, majority of investigations are done by private companies on a consulting basis. Within the US, national organizations such as the American Cultural Resources Association, or ACRA, exist to support the practice of CRM. Museums, besides being popular tourist attractions, often play roles in conservation of, and research on, threatened sites, including as repositories for collections from sites slated for destruction.

=== Maritime Archaeology in CRM ===
Maritime archaeology became a routine component of Cultural Resource management (CRM) in the United States during the late 1970s, as reflected in National Park Service CRM publications that addresses underwater archaeological survey methods as standard practice.

Under the National Historic Preservation Act of 1966, archaeological resources - including submerged sites- are treated as historic properties and are subject to consideration during federal project review.

By the early 1980s, maritime archaeology was institutionalized within CRM programs through dedicated federal initiatives and professional practices focused in submerged cultural resources. The Abandoned Shipwreck Act of 1987 further reinforced public stewardship responsibilities for historic shipwrecks, strengthening their integration into routine CRM practice.

== CRM in US States ==
=== California CRM ===
Cultural Resource Management in California was originally determined by rulings like the National Register of Historic Places or the Native American Graves Protections and Repatriation Act (NAGPRA). While many states teaching and working in the CRM space primarily operate off of these rulings and others currently in use listed above. California decided that the national level legislation was not enough to cover the needs of the 150+ unique tribal identities that call the state home. Listed below are the unique Cultural Management laws that shape the field in the state of California.

==== Policies in California ====
===== CalNAGPRA =====
AB-978, titled the California Native American Graves Protection and Repatriation Act was passed in 2001 by the State Legislature. The bill requires all state agencies and museums that receive state funding that have control over or possession of collections that have human remains or cultural materials to form a process for identifying tribal association and a plan for repatriation of these artifacts. This bill also created a Repatriation Oversight Commission to oversee the process in the state.

After several years of enforcement for CalNAGPRA after facing opposition from state run universities, the state passed AB-2836. This bill added in 2018 added additional responsibilities to the Repatriation Oversight Commission to assist the University of California in adopting policies and procedures to become compliant with CalNAGPRA.

The most recent change to CalNAGPRA came in 2020 with the passing of AB-275 which went into effect January 1, 2021. AB-275 similarly to AB-2836 added additional responsibilities to the Repatriation Oversight Commission. AB-275 requires the commission to maintain a list of California Indian Tribes and their respective territory spaces in the state. AB-285 also requires the commission to publish notices of preliminary inventories and summaries on the commission website.

===== CEQA =====
The California Environmental Quality Act was passed in 1970 to protect the environment by requiring state and local agencies to identify, disclose, and mitigate significant, avoidable environmental damage from discretionary projects. While many aspects of this bill can be used to dispute issues in CRM in the state the most common is AB-52. AB-52 required an update to the existing guidelines for the CEQA Initial Study Checklist. These new checklist questions asked evaluators to consider impacts to tribal cultural resources. These resources include but are not limited to a site, feature, place, cultural landscape that is geographically defined in terms of the size and scope of the landscape, sacred place, or object with cultural value to a California Native American tribe.

==== CRM Maritime Archaeology in California ====
Maritime archaeology in California became an established component of Cultural Resource Management (CRM) in the 70's and 80's reflecting the state's extensive coastline, long maritime history, and early regulatory oversight of submerged lands. In addition to federal historic preservation requirements, archaeological review in California maritime and coastal contexts is shaped by state-level permitting and environmental review processes, including the California Coastal Act and the California Environmental Quality Act (CEQA).

The Management of state-owned submerged lands in California is governed by statue, establishing state jurisdiction over coastal and offshore development and requiring archaeological considerations as part of routine review processes.

Federal-State collaboration further reinforced the routine application of maritime archaeology in California through National Park Service programs, including the formation of the Submerged Cultural Resources Unit in 1980 to provide ongoing underwater archaeological expertise for resource management.

== Careers in CRM ==
Cultural resource management features people from a wide array of disciplines. The general education of most involved in CRM includes, but is not limited to, sociology, archaeology, architectural history, cultural anthropology, social and cultural geography, and other fields in the social sciences. Common roles for cultural resource managers typically include being in charge of museums, galleries, theatres etc., especially those that emphasize culture specific to the local region or ethnic group. Cultural tourism is a significant sector of the tourism industry.

In the field of cultural resource management there are many career choices. One could obtain a career with an action agency that works directly with the NEPA or even more specifically, Native American resources. There are also careers that can be found in review agencies like the Advisory Council on Historic Preservation (ACHP), or the state historic preservation office (SHPO). Beyond these choices, one could also obtain a career as part of the local government and work with planning agencies, housing agencies, social service agencies, local museums, libraries, or educational institutions. Jobs at private cultural resource management companies can range from field technicians (see shovelbum) to principal investigators, project archaeologists, historic preservationists, and laboratory work. One could also become a part of an advocacy organization, such as the National Trust for Historic Preservation.

=== Management of cultural organizations ===
The vocation of management in cultural and creative sectors is the subject of research and improvement initiatives, by organizations such as Arts and Business which take a partnership approach to involving professional business people in running and mentoring arts organizations. Some universities now offer vocational degrees.

The management of cultural heritage is underpinned by academic research in archaeology, ethnography and history. The broader subject is also underpinned by research in sociology and culture studies.

== Debates and Controversies ==
=== Debates ===
It is commonly debated in cultural resource management how to determine whether cultural or archaeological sites should be considered significant or not. The criteria that is stated by the National Register of Historic Places is said to be able to be "interpreted in different ways so that the significance... may be subjectively argued for many cultural resources." Another issue that arises among scholars is that "protection does not necessarily mean preservation." Any public projects occurring near the cultural resource can have adverse effects. Development plans for a proposed project may not be able to be changed to limit impact and to avoid damage to the resource.

=== Critique on Policies ===
Cultural resources policies have developed over time with the recognition of the economic and social importance of heritage and other cultural assets.

The exploitation of cultural resources can be controversial, particularly where the finite cultural heritage resources of developing countries are exported to satisfy the demand for antiquities market in the developed world. The exploitation of the potential intellectual property of traditional remedies in identifying candidates for new drugs has also been controversial. On the other hand, traditional crafts can be important elements of income from tourism, performance of traditional dances, and music that is popular with tourists and traditional designs can be exploited in the fashion industry. Popular culture can also be an important economic asset.

== See also ==
- Centre for Cultural Resources and Training
- Committee on Education, Culture, Tourism and Human Resources
- Community art
- Cultural anthropology
- Cultural Heritage Management
- Cultural landscape
- Cultural tourism
- Historic preservation
- Intangible culture
- Masterpieces of the Oral and Intangible Heritage of Humanity
- National Register of Historic Places
- Natural resource management
- Portal:Arts
- Public history
- Rescue archaeology
- Urban culture
- Valletta Treaty
