= Archaeological Resources Protection Act of 1979 =

United States federal law

- Long title: An Act to protect archaeological resources on public lands and Indian lands, and for other purposes.
- Acronyms (colloquial): ARPA
- Enacted by: the 96th United States Congress

Citations
- Public law: Pub. L. 96–95
- Statutes at Large: 93 Stat. 721

Codification
- Titles amended: 16 U.S.C. §§ 470aa–470mm

Legislative history
- Introduced in the House as H.R. 1825 by Rep. Morris K. Udall (D–AZ) on February 1, 1979; Committee consideration by House Interior and Insular Affairs; Senate Energy and Natural Resources; Passed the House on July 9, 1979; Passed the Senate on July 30, 1979; Reported by the joint conference committee on October 12, 1979; agreed to by the House on October 17, 1979; Signed into law by President Jimmy Carter on October 31, 1979

The Archaeological Resources Protection Act of 1979 (Pub. L. 96–95 as amended, 93 Stat. 721, codified at 16 U.S.C. §§ 470aa–470mm), also referred to as ARPA, is a federal law of the United States passed in 1979 and amended in 1988. It governs the excavation of archaeological sites on federal and Native American lands in the United States, and the removal and disposition of archaeological collections from those sites.

ARPA was launched in the 1970s after the criminal provisions of the Antiquities Act of 1906 were declared "unconstitutionally vague" in some jurisdictions and unable to protect historic and precontact sites on federal lands from theft, excavation, injury, or destruction. The Antiquities Act was unable to protect historical sites from criminal looting. Several attempts by the federal land-managing agencies and prosecutors to use this act resulted in judges saying that provisions regarding criminal prosecution were unconstitutionally vague making it unenforceable. ARPA regulates access to archaeological resources on federal and Native American lands. Uniform regulations were issued by the Department of the Interior, the Department of Agriculture, the Tennessee Valley Authority, and the Department of Defense. Archaeological resources are defined as "any material remains of human life or activities which are at least 100 years of age, and which are archaeological interest." ARPA also defines "of archaeological interest" as "capable of providing scientific or humanistic understandings of past human behavior, cultural adaption, and related topics." ARPA forbids anyone from excavating or removing archaeological resources from federal or Native American land without a permit from a land managing agency. ARPA also forbids any sales, purchase, exchange, transport, or receipt. Those who violate can face substantial fines and even a jail sentence if convicted, and any relevant archaeological resources will be confiscated.

== See also ==
- National Historic Preservation Act of 1966
- Native American Graves Protection and Repatriation Act
