= Roald H. Fryxell =

American geologist and archaeologist

Roald Hilding Fryxell (February 18, 1934 – May 18, 1974) was an American educator, geologist and archaeologist. He was a Professor of Anthropology at Washington State University (WSU) and pioneer in the interdisciplinary field of geoarchaeology, with a career that involved work on monumental projects in North America and even outer space.

== Early life ==
Roald H. Fryxell, or later known as "Fryx" to his friends, was born on February 18, 1934, in Moline, Illinois. His parents were Fritiof Fryxell, a renowned mountain climber, writer, and Professor of Geology, and Regina Holmén Fryxell, an organist and music teacher. Both parents were on the faculty of Augustana College in Illinois. From a young age, Roald was involved in drawing, sports, and poetry but pursued science, and later selected geology for his graduate studies.

== Education ==
Fryxell graduated in 1956 with an A.B. degree in geology from Augustana College, where his parents worked. After graduating, Roald married his college sweetheart, Helen Broberg. After their honeymoon in Jackson Hole, Roald worked a short stint as the naturalist for Grand Teton National Park until starting graduate school at Washington State University (WSU). While at WSU, Roald broadened his education, taking classes in ecology, archaeology, and pedology under Rexford F. Daubenmire, Richard Daugherty and Henry Smith. In the summers of graduate school, 1957 and 58, Roald worked for the Bureau of Indian Affairs on the Colville Reservation. During this time Roald and Helen had two children, Jenny and Tom. While raising his family, Roald took a job as Superintendent of Ginkgo Petrified Forest State Park. In September 1971 Roald returned to WSU and was hired as a Junior Geologist. Fryxell worked with his students and Richard Daugherty on the Marmes Rock Shelter at the confluence of the Palouse and Snake Rivers. The site was found to be 10,000 to 12,000 years old and therefore a monumental find in North America. In 1971 Fryxell completed his Ph.D. at the University of Idaho.

== Career ==
Dr. Fryxell, known as "Fryx" by his friends, later became professor of anthropology specializing in geochronology at Washington State University. He was noted for his interdisciplinary work in geoarchaeology. During the 1960s Fryxell worked with two members of the U.S. Geological Survey under a National Science Foundation grant to study an archeological site named Hueyatlaco, at the north shore of the Valsequillo Reservoir, in the state of Puebla, Mexico. They discovered stone tools that they dated from 250,000 years ago. This finding was received with great skepticism by the archaeological community.

In 1968 Fryxell was a co-principal investigator with Richard Daugherty (WSU) during the unearthing of the Marmes Rockshelter from the floodplain of the Palouse River near the confluence of the Palouse and Snake Rivers in southeastern Washington. The site was found to contain some of the oldest human remains in the western hemisphere at 12,000 years of age.

In 1969, The Senate of the State of Washington offered Roald Fryxell and Richard Daugherty the titles of "Distinguished Citizen". Fryxell was then listed as one of the Outstanding Young Men of America in Who's Who in the West.

Although a geologist by training, his work was extremely interdisciplinary. He was influenced by the archaeology of Dr. Daugherty and created new methods for archaeological sampling methods. For example, his soil stratigraphy sampling which later became known as soil monoliths. This preserved entire sections of the stratigraphy of a site, which could then be brought back to the archaeological laboratory at Washington State University.

Teaching was of primary importance to Fryxell and he involved students on many of his monumental projects. Leslie Wildeson remembers him as teaching his students to truly understand the why behind every question, the reason for every method and power of the scientific method.

In 1971 after the Marmes project, Fryxell was selected to be part of the team of geologists in Houston who examined rocks brought back from the Moon during the Apollo program. Fryxell was hired by NASA to analyze lunar samples from numerous Apollo missions. He was also the designer of the apparatus used for collecting core samples of the Moon's surface. The lunar crater Fryxell is named after him.

== Contributions to Preservation Archaeology ==
Roald Fryxell is often known best for his efforts to research, protect, and later salvage the Marmes Rockshelter Site. In May 1968 through February 1969, Roald Fryxell was the Principal Investigator of the Marmes project, which involved salvage excavation of the site prior to a water reclamation project conducted by the US Army Corps of Engineers. With the site's location above Lower Monumental Dam, it was to be quickly inundated with the rising reservoir in February 1969. This led to an enormous archaeological salvage effort in the months leading up to the water rise. Despite the salvage efforts, Fryxell and Daugherty continued to fight the Army Corps of Engineers and Federal Government to delay the inundation of the site and preserve the area for future generations.

The Marmes site had been listed on the National Register of Historic Places as part of The Palouse Archaeological District and was designated a National Historic Landmark by 1967. The two professors gave talks, presentations and sent pleas for help through hundreds of institutions. They caught the attention of President Lyndon B. Johnson, who issued an Executive Order to protect the site. This order allotted 1.5 million dollars toward building a coffer dam around the site to hold back the water. However, disaster struck when the barrier failed, and water seeped through the earth-fill wall. Excavation of the site had little more than started when the barrier failed. An army of volunteers and archaeologists were present at the site as it became inundated by the reservoir waters. They attempted to protect the site with tarps and tons of sand and gravel in hopes of preserving it for future studies.

== Death and legacy ==
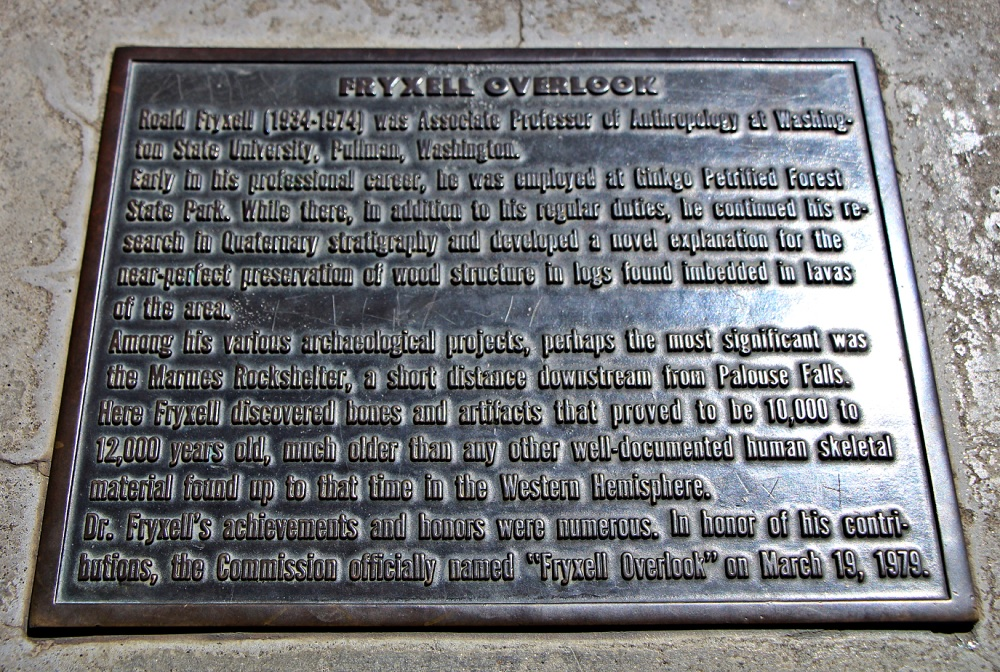
The memorial plaque to Roald Fryxell pictured at the Fryxell Overlook at Palouse Falls State Park.

Fryxell died in 1974 in a car accident at only 40 years of age while driving across Washington State. He is remembered a teacher, leader, and pioneer of interdisciplinary education. "It is Fryxell's teaching, and his passionate caring about the research process, his students, and science itself, that live after him." His family chose to honor his memory by endowing the Fryxell Award for Interdisciplinary Research, given annually by the Society for American Archaeology in recognition of interdisciplinary excellence by a scientist. The Society for American Archaeology also holds a Fryxell Symposium during their meetings. An overlook shelter at the Palouse Falls is also named after him, as is the Roald H. Fryxell Memorial Scholarship at Augustana College. At Washington State University, colleagues established the Roald Fryxell Publication Fund for the Department of Anthropology.

In 1985, Fryxell crater on the far side of the Moon was named after him.

== Bibliography ==
- Fryxell, Roald, The Contribution of Inter Disciplinary Research to Geologic Investigation of Prehistory, Eastern Washington (Unpublished Ph.D. dissertation, Department of Geology, University of Idaho, Moscow. 1970)
- Fryxell, Roald and Daugherty, R.D., Interim Report: Archaeological Salvage in the Lower Monumental Reservoir, Washington (1962, Washington State University, Pullman)
- Fryxell, Roald, Mazama and Glacier Peak Volcanic Ash Layers: Relative Ages (Science, 147, 1965)
- Fryxell, Roald, and Bennie C. Keel, Emergency Salvage Excavations for the Recovery of Early Human Remains and Related Scientific Materials from the Marmes Rockshelter Archaeological Site, Southeastern Washington, May 3—December 15, 1968 (Report to U. S. Army Corps of Engineers, Washington State University)
- Fryxell, Roald et al., A Human Skeleton from Sediments of Mid-Pinedale Age in Southeastern Washington (American Antiquity, 33, 1968)
- V. Steen-McIntyre, R. Fryxell, and H.E. Maude, Geological Evidence for Age of Deposits of Huetatlaco Archeological Site, Valsequillo, Mexico (Quaternary Research, 16, 1981)
- Fryxell, Roald, and Richard D. Daugherty, Demonstration of Techniques for Preserving Archaeological Stratigraphy (n.p., 1984)

== Sources ==
- Cocks, Elijah E.; Cocks, Josiah C. Who's Who on the Moon: A Biographical Dictionary of Lunar Nomenclature (Tudor Publishers. 1995) ISBN 0-936389-27-3.
