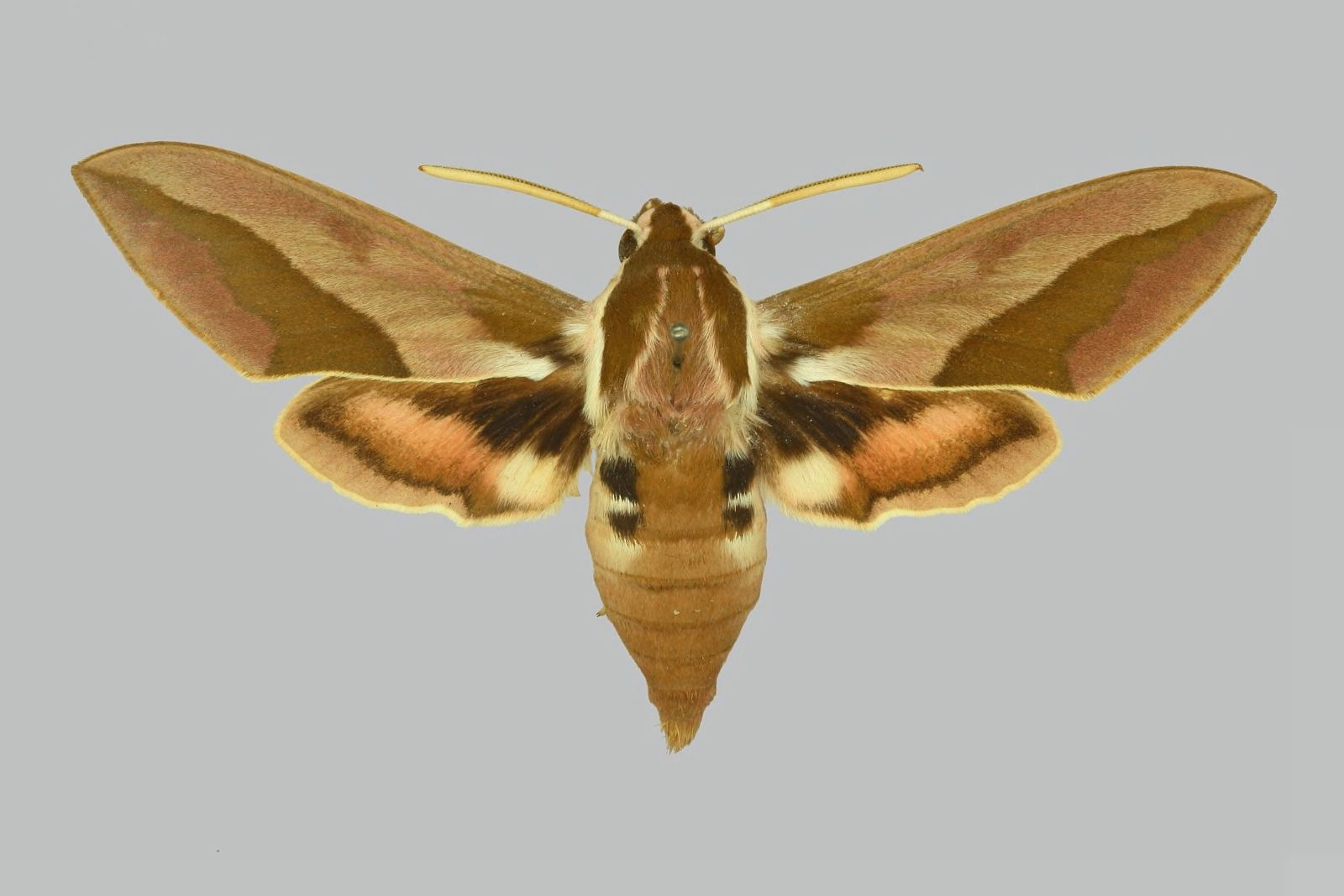
- Male

Scientific classification
- Kingdom: Animalia
- Phylum: Arthropoda
- Class: Insecta
- Order: Lepidoptera
- Family: Sphingidae
- Genus: Hyles
- Species: H. siehei

Binomial name
- Hyles siehei (Pungeler, 1903)

Synonyms
- Deilephila siehei Püngeler, 1903; Hyles siehei privata Austaut, 1905

= Hyles siehei =

Species of moth

Hyles siehei is a moth of the family Sphingidae. It is known in southern and eastern Turkey, Armenia, northern Syria, northern Iraq and northern Iran.

The wingspan is 65–70 mm for ssp. siehei and 55–65 mm for ssp. svetlana. Adults of ssp. siehei are on wing from late May to June in one generation. Adults of ssp. svetlana are on wing from late April to late May (with a peak in mid-May), also in one generation.

The larvae of ssp. siehei mainly feed on the seed- and flower-heads of Eremurus species, such as Eremurus himalaicus, Eremurus olgae, Eremurus robustus, Eremurus krudica and Eremurus stenophyllus, but have also been recorded on the seedheads of Asphodelus and Asphodeline species. Larvae of ssp. svetlana have also been recorded feeding on the flower- and seedheads Eremurus species, especially Eremurus sogriganus, Eremurus inderiensis and Eremurus ambigens.

== Subspecies ==
- Hyles siehei siehei (eastern Toros and Bolkar Mountains of southern Turkey, eastern Turkey, Armenia, northern Syria, northern Iraq and northern Iran. Then probably south along the Zagros Mountains of Iran to Kerman Province)
- Hyles siehei svetlana Shovkoon, 2010 (lowland southern Kazakhstan, from the shores of the Caspian Sea across to the Chinese border, southern Uzbekistan and northern Turkmenistan)
