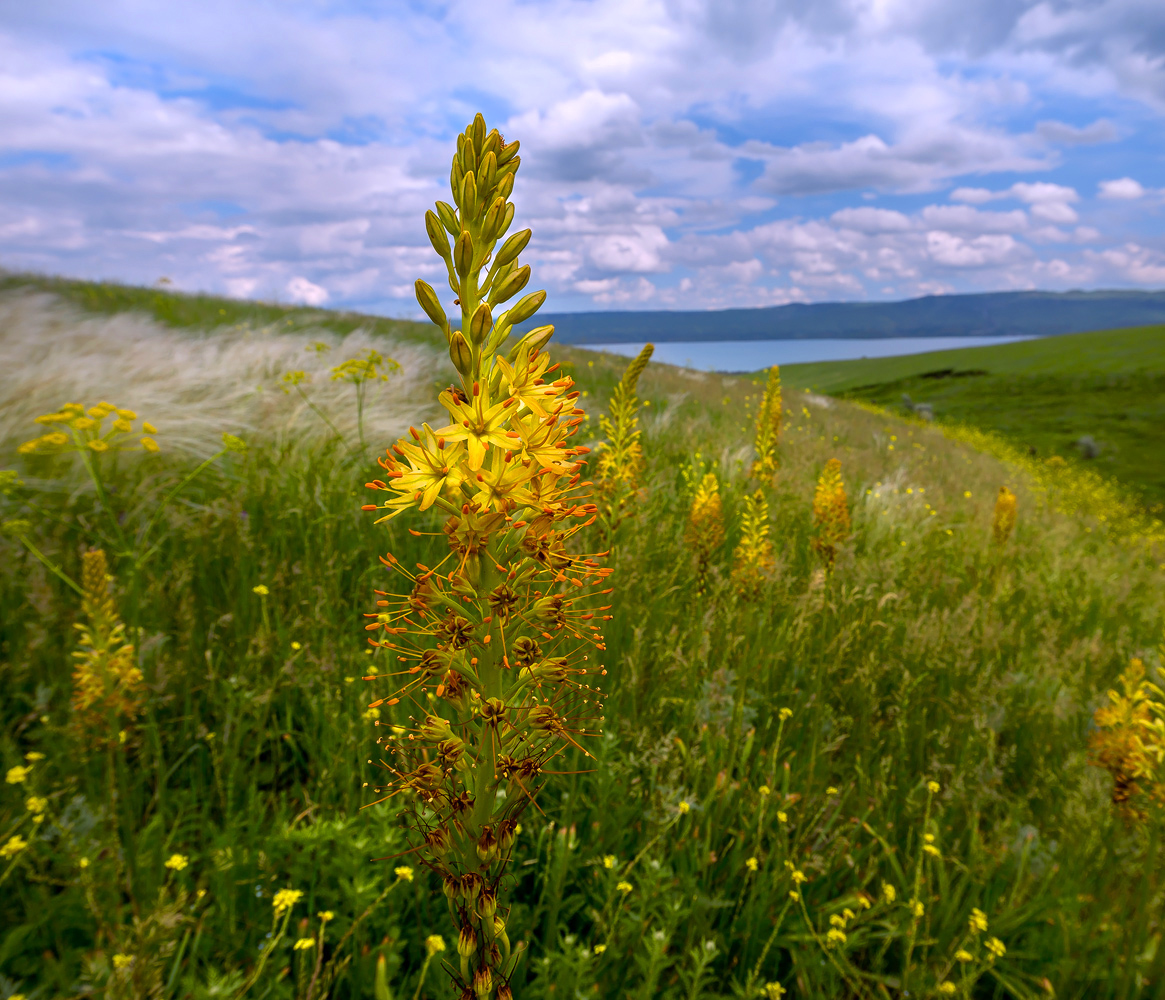

Scientific classification
- Kingdom: Plantae
- Clade: Embryophytes
- Clade: Tracheophytes
- Clade: Angiosperms
- Clade: Monocots
- Order: Asparagales
- Family: Asphodelaceae
- Subfamily: Asphodeloideae
- Genus: Eremurus
- Species: E. spectabilis

Binomial name
- Eremurus spectabilis M.Bieb.

Synonyms
- Asphodelus regius Heynh.; Eremurus bachtiaricus Boiss.; Eremurus caucasicus Steven; Eremurus libanoticus Boiss.; Eremurus sibiricus Weinm., nom. nud.; Eremurus tauricus Weinm., nom. nud.

= Eremurus spectabilis =

Species of flowering plant

Eremurus spectabilis, is a species of flowering plant in the family Asphodelaceae. It is widely distributed from the eastern Mediterranean to the Caucasus.

== Description ==
Eremurus spectabilis is a perennial, herbaceous plant in the genus Eremurus. In March and April, fresh leaves are consumed as a vegetable when they come out of the soil as buds.

== Taxonomy ==
The species was first described in 1819 as Eremurus spectabilis by Friedrich August Marschall von Bieberstein. In 1830, Carl Friedrich von Ledebour used the same name for a different species. His illegitimate name is now treated as a synonym of Eremurus altaicus.

== Distribution ==
Eremurus spectabilis is native to Iran, Iraq, Lebanon-Syria, the North Caucasus, the Palestine region, south European Russia, the Transcaucasus, Turkey, Turkmenistan and Ukraine.

== Uses ==
There are many plants in the Eastern Anatolia Region of Turkey where they are consumed as food.
