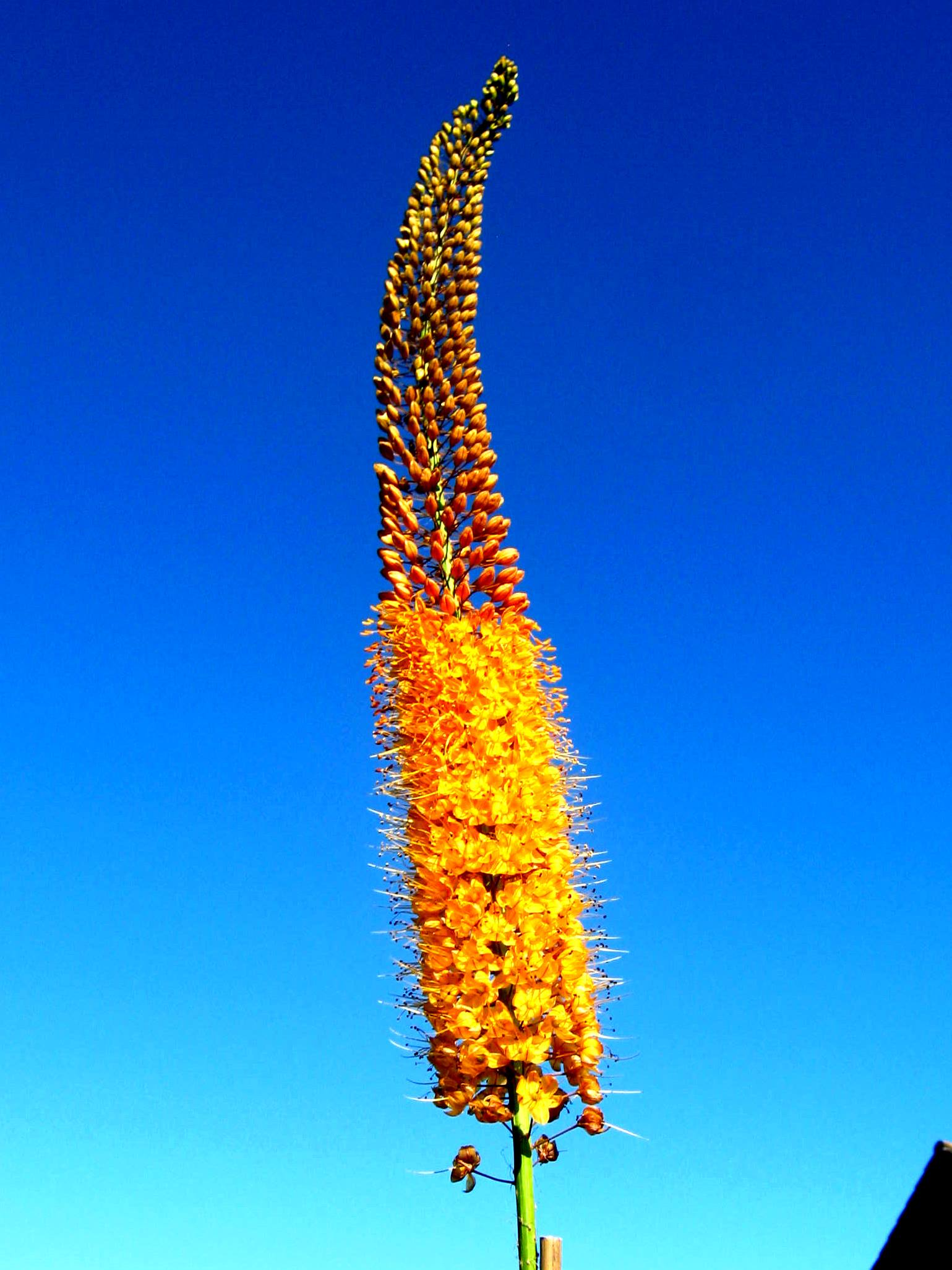
- Eremurus × isabellinus 'Pinokkio'

Scientific classification
- Kingdom: Plantae
- Clade: Tracheophytes
- Clade: Angiosperms
- Clade: Monocots
- Order: Asparagales
- Family: Asphodelaceae
- Subfamily: Asphodeloideae
- Genus: Eremurus
- Species: E. × isabellinus

Binomial name
- Eremurus × isabellinus P. Vilm.

Synonyms
- Eremurus × shelfordi

= Eremurus × isabellinus =

Species of flowering plant

Eremurus × isabellinus is a hybrid of garden origin, derived from the crossing of E. stenophyllus with E. olgae. The first crossing was made by Sir Michael Foster at Great Shelford, England, at the end of the 19th century, and replicated in France by the Vilmorin nursery at Verrières-le-Buisson in 1902. The name of the hybrid is derived from the isabelline colour of the original F1 hybrid flowers. The genus is often known by the common names foxtail lily and desert candle.

== Description ==
Eremurus × isabellinus produces stems 1.5 m high terminating in bottlebrush-like inflorescences in June and July. The narrow strap-like leaves form a mound of bluish green foliage at the base, which begins to die off as the plant flowers.

== Cultivation ==
Eremurus × isabellinus is fully hardy, and best grown in full sun in a fertile, sandy, well-drained soil; it tolerates alkaline conditions. The hybrid has given rise to around 20 cultivars, assembled into groups defined by origin: Shelfordi and Ruiter are the oldest; more recently, Amand, Highdown, and Erfo.

=== Selected cultivars ===
- 'Brutus' - pure white
- 'Cleopatra' - burnt orange
- 'Emmy Ro' - deep yellow
- Erfo hybrids - mixed colours
- 'Image' - bright yellow
- 'Lemon Meringue' - soft yellow
- 'Line Dance' - white
- 'Moneymaker' - deep yellow
- 'Moonlight' - pale yellow
- 'Oase' - pale peach
- 'Obelisk' - white
- 'Pinokkio' - orange (chrome yellow, in error)
- 'Rexona' - salmon pink
- 'Romance' - pale salmon
- 'Rosalind' - bright pink
- Ruiter hybrids - mixed colours
- 'Rumba' - orange
- Shelford hybrids - mixed colours
- 'Tap Dance' - yellow
- 'White Beauty' - clear white
