= Eremurus iae =

Scientific classification
- Kingdom: Plantae
- Clade: Embryophytes
- Clade: Tracheophytes
- Clade: Angiosperms
- Clade: Monocots
- Order: Asparagales
- Family: Asphodelaceae
- Subfamily: Asphodeloideae
- Genus: Eremurus
- Species: E. iae

Binomial name
- Eremurus iae Vved.

Species of flowering plant

Eremurus iae is a perennial flowering plant belonging to the family Asphodelaceae, first described by Alexei Ivanovich Vvedensky. It is native to Tajikistan and Uzbekistan. It is included in the Red Book of the Republic of Uzbekistan as a rare, endemic species. It is distributed in the Surxondaryo Region, the Hisar ridge, the Topolondarya basins and the northern slopes of the Boysun mountain.
