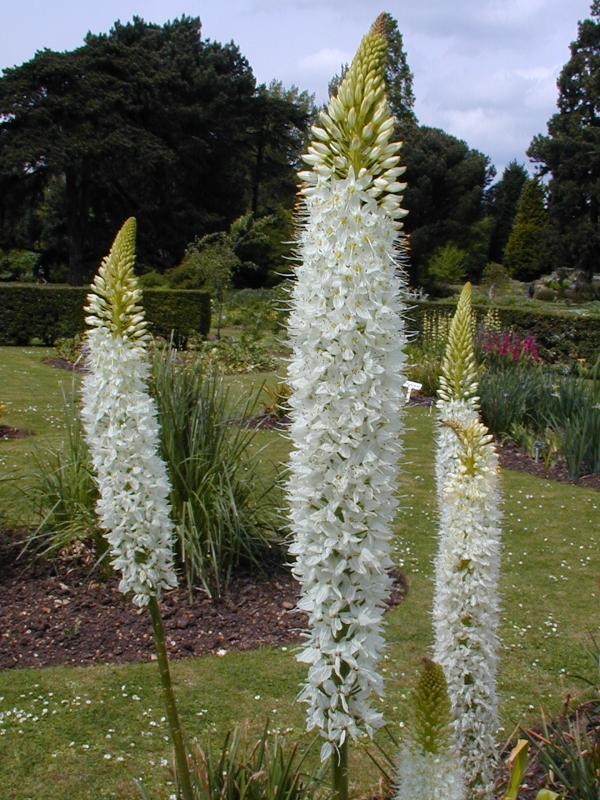
- Eremurus himalaicus

Scientific classification
- Kingdom: Plantae
- Clade: Tracheophytes
- Clade: Angiosperms
- Clade: Monocots
- Order: Asparagales
- Family: Asphodelaceae
- Subfamily: Asphodeloideae
- Genus: Eremurus

Type species
- Eremurus spectabilis

Synonyms
- Ammolirion Kar. & Kir.; Henningia Kar. & Kir.; Selonia Regel

= Eremurus =

Genus of flowering plants

Eremurus /ˌɛrɪˈmjʊərəs/ is a genus of deciduous perennial flowers in the family Asphodelaceae. They are also known as the foxtail lilies or desert candles. They are native to eastern Europe (Russia and Ukraine), and temperate Asia from Turkey to China, with many species in Central Asia.

The inflorescence consists of a tall floral spike whose individual flowers extend their anthers around the stem axis as in the bottle brushes. Depending on the species, the spike consists of many densely-arranged, small flowers in shades of orange, yellow, white, pale pink or red-orange. The grey-green, straplike leaves grow in a tuft from the succulent root crown. Eremurus is known for its thick, fingerlike roots, which grow from a central growth point. The blooming spike is notably tall and relatively narrow, rising from 3 to 9 or 10 feet above the foliage, depending on the species. These plants are mainly native to western and Central Asia, although Eremurus thiodanthus is endemic to the Crimea.

== Species ==
As of November 2023, Plants of the World Online accepted the following species:

- Eremurus afghanicus Gilli - Afghanistan
- Eremurus aitchisonii Baker - Afghanistan, Pakistan, Kyrgyzstan, Tajikistan, Uzbekistan
- Eremurus alaicus Khalk - Kyrgyzstan
- Eremurus albertii Regel - Afghanistan, Kyrgyzstan, Tajikistan, Uzbekistan
- Eremurus × albocitrinus Baker - Iran (E. olgae × E. stenophyllus)
- Eremurus altaicus (Pall.) Steven - Altai Republic, Kazakhstan, Kyrgyzstan, Tajikistan, Uzbekistan, Xinjiang, Mongolia
- Eremurus ammophilus Vved. - Uzbekistan
- Eremurus anisopterus (Kar. & Kir.) Regel - Kazakhstan, Uzbekistan, Xinjiang
- Eremurus azerbajdzhanicus Kharkev. - Caucasus
- Eremurus bactrianus Wendelbo - Afghanistan
- Eremurus brachystemon Vved. - Tajikistan
- Eremurus bucharicus Regel - Afghanistan, Tajikistan
- Eremurus candidus Vved. - Tajikistan
- Eremurus cappadocicus J.Gay ex Baker - Turkey, Iraq, Syria
- Eremurus chinensis O.Fedtsch. - Gansu, Sichuan, Tibet, Yunnan
- †Eremurus chloranthus Popov - Uzbekistan but extinct
- Eremurus comosus O.Fedtsch. - Afghanistan, Kyrgyzstan, Tajikistan
- Eremurus cristatus Vved. - Kazakhstan, Kyrgyzstan
- Eremurus czatkalicus Lazkov - Kyrgyzstan
- Eremurus × decoloratus Lazkov & Naumenko (E. lactiflorus × E. regelii) - Kyrgyzstan
- Eremurus dolichomischus Vved. & Wendelbo - Afghanistan, Pakistan
- Eremurus furseorum Wendelbo - Afghanistan
- Eremurus fuscus (O.Fedtsch.) Vved - Kazakhstan, Kyrgyzstan, Pakistan, Tajikistan
- Eremurus × gypsaceus Lazkov (E. cristatus × E. zoae) – Kyrgyzstan
- Eremurus hilariae Popov & Vved. - Kazakhstan, Kyrgyzstan, Tajikistan, Uzbekistan
- Eremurus himalaicus Baker - Himalayas of Afghanistan + Pakistan + Kashmir
- Eremurus hissaricus Vved - Gissar Range in Tajikistan + Uzbekistan
- Eremurus iae Vved. - Tajikistan, Uzbekistan
- Eremurus inderiensis (M.Bieb.) Regel - European Russia, Western Siberia, Central Asia, Iran, Pakistan, Afghanistan, Xinjiang, Mongolia
- Eremurus × isabellinus P. L. Vilm. (E. stenophyllus × E. olgae) - garden origin
- Eremurus jungei Juz. - Crimea
- Eremurus kaufmannii Regel - Afghanistan, Kyrgyzstan, Tajikistan, Uzbekistan
- Eremurus kopet-daghensis Karrer - Turkmenistan, Iran
- Eremurus korovinii B.Fedtsch. - Kazakhstan, Tajikistan, Uzbekistan
- Eremurus korshinskyi O.Fedtsch - Afghanistan, Tajikistan
- Eremurus lachnostegius Vved. - Tajikistan
- Eremurus lactiflorus O.Fedtsch. - Kazakhstan, Kyrgyzstan, Uzbekistan
- Eremurus × ludmillae Levichev & Priszter - Uzbekistan (E. regelii × E. turkestanicus)
- Eremurus luteus Baker - Turkmenistan, Iran, Afghanistan, Tajikistan, Uzbekistan
- Eremurus micranthus Vved. - Tajikistan
- Eremurus × nikitinae Lazkov (E. cristatus × E. fuscus) – Kyrgyzstan
- Eremurus nuratavicus Khokhr. Uzbekistan
- Eremurus olgae Regel - a dwarf species flowering in June or July, making it one of the last species to flower - Turkmenistan, Iran, Afghanistan, Tajikistan, Uzbekistan, Kyrgyzstan
- Eremurus parviflorus Regel - Pamir Mountains in Tajikistan
- Eremurus persicus (Jaub. & Spach) Boiss. - Iran, Afghanistan, Pakistan, Kashmir
- Eremurus pubescens Vved. - Tajikistan
- Eremurus rechingeri Wendelbo - Iraq
- Eremurus regelii Vved. - Tajikistan, Uzbekistan, Kyrgyzstan, Kazakhstan
- Eremurus robustus (Regel) Regel - Tajikistan, Uzbekistan, Kyrgyzstan, Kazakhstan - grows from 6 to 10 feet high.
- Eremurus roseolus Vved - Afghanistan, Tajikistan
- Eremurus saprjagajevii B.Fedtsch. - Tajikistan, Uzbekistan
- Eremurus soogdianus (Regel) Benth. & Hook.f. - Tajikistan, Uzbekistan, Kyrgyzstan, Kazakhstan, Afghanistan
- Eremurus spectabilis M.Bieb. - European Russia, Ukraine, Caucasus, Iran, Iraq, Turkey, Syria, Lebanon, the Palestine region, Turkmenistan
- Eremurus stenophyllus (Boiss. & Buhse) Baker syn. E. bungei - Tajikistan, Uzbekistan, Kyrgyzstan, Iran, Afghanistan, Pakistan
- Eremurus subalbiflorus Vved. - Turkmenistan, Iran
- Eremurus suworowii Regel - Afghanistan, Tajikistan, Uzbekistan
- Eremurus tadshikorum Vved. - Tajikistan
- Eremurus tauricus Steven - Crimea, northern Caucasus in Russia
- Eremurus thiodanthus Juz. - Crimea
- Eremurus tianschanicus Pazij & Vved. ex Pavlov - Tajikistan, Kyrgyzstan, Kazakhstan
- Eremurus turkestanicus Regel - Tajikistan, Uzbekistan, Kyrgyzstan, Kazakhstan
- Eremurus wallii Rech.f. - Syria
- Eremurus × warei Jekyll & E.T.Cook (E. olgae × E. stenophyllus) – Iran
- Eremurus zangezuricus Mikheev - southern Caucasus
- Eremurus zenaidae Vved. - Tajikistan, Uzbekistan, Kyrgyzstan
- Eremurus zoae Vved. - Kyrgyzstan

== Cultivation ==
Eremurus is hardy to USDA Zones 5–7. Usually four species are available commercially for cultivation:

- E. himalaicus grows to about 4 ft (1.2 m) with pure white racemes
- E. robustus can reach 8–10 ft (2.4–3.0 m) in height with pink or white flower spikes
- E. stenophyllus, a dwarf species, reaches 2–3 ft (0.61–0.91 m) in height with yellow flowers.

Also E. × isabellinus which is a hybrid of E. olgae and E. stenophyllus is available as 'Cleopatra', with orange spikes.

The cultivar 'Joanna' has won the Royal Horticultural Society's Award of Garden Merit.

The octopus-like tuberous roots are easily injured; planting on a cone of soil, with the crown on the peak and the roots hanging down, is recommended. Plants are readily affected by winter root rot, so that a layer of sand or gravel beneath is recommended to ensure drainage. Covering with compost or mulch provides protection from frost.

== Gallery ==
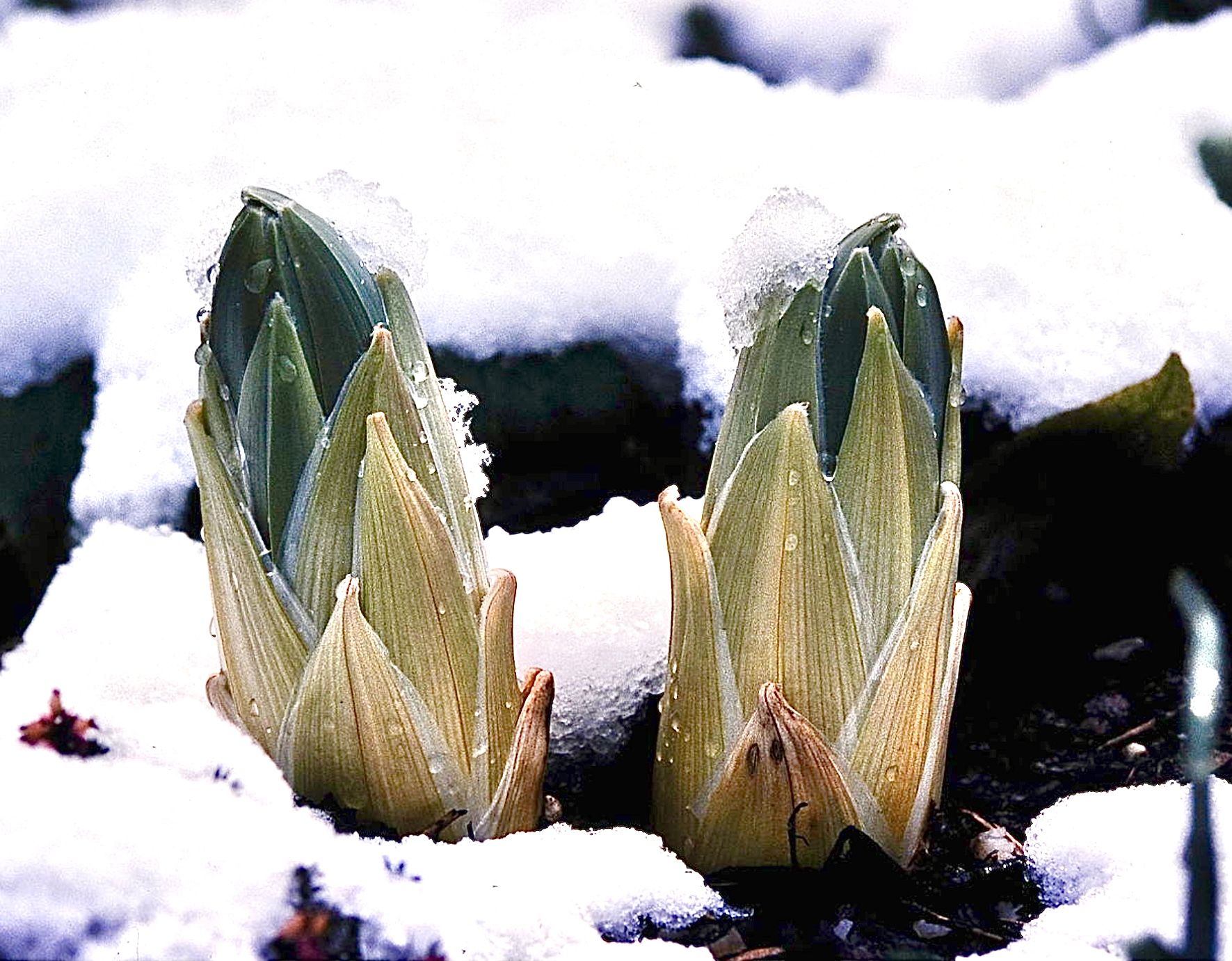
E. robustus leaf rosettes, in bud, emerging from snowy ground

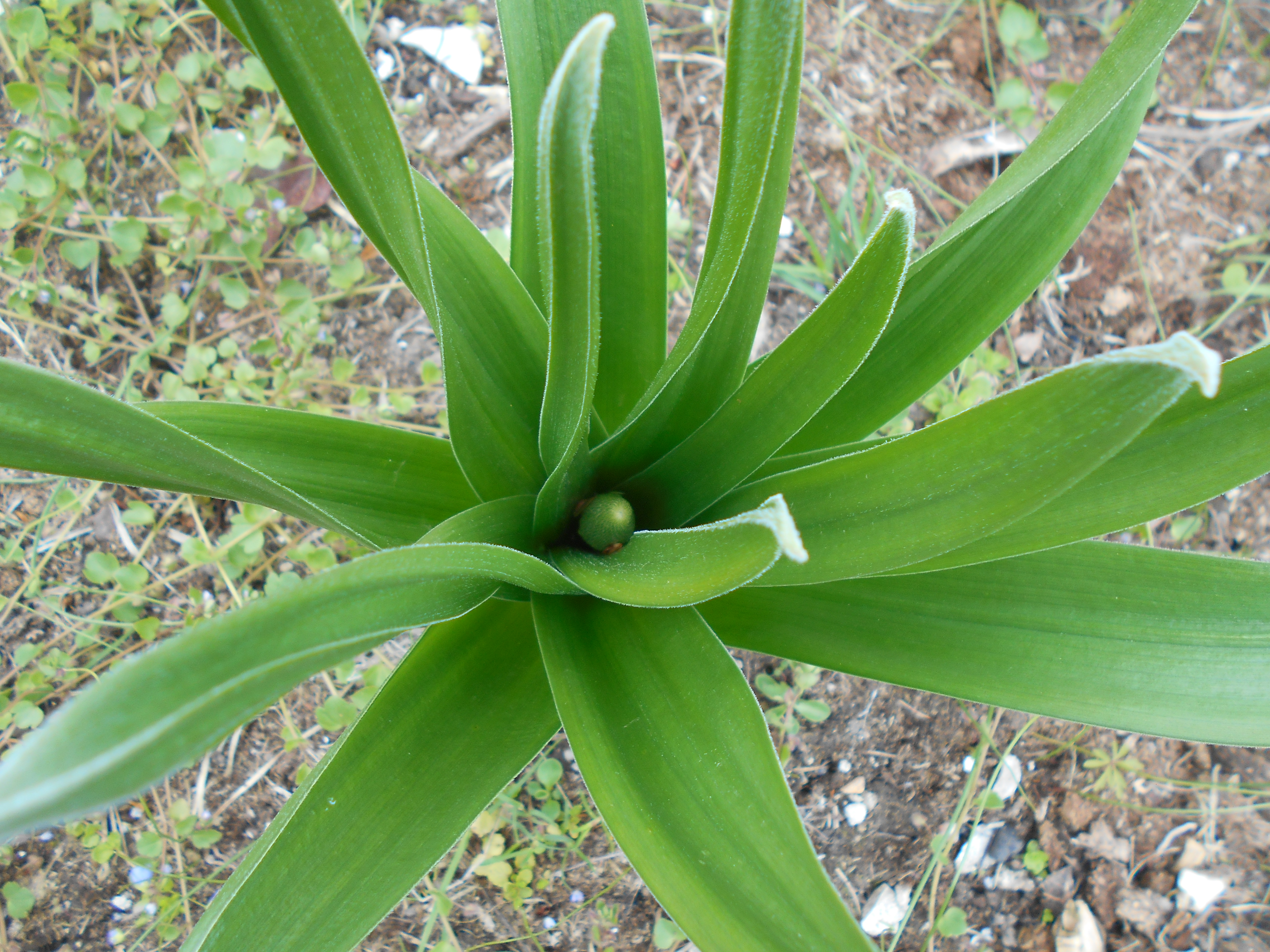
E. robustus leaf rosette at time of first appearance of embryonic flower spike

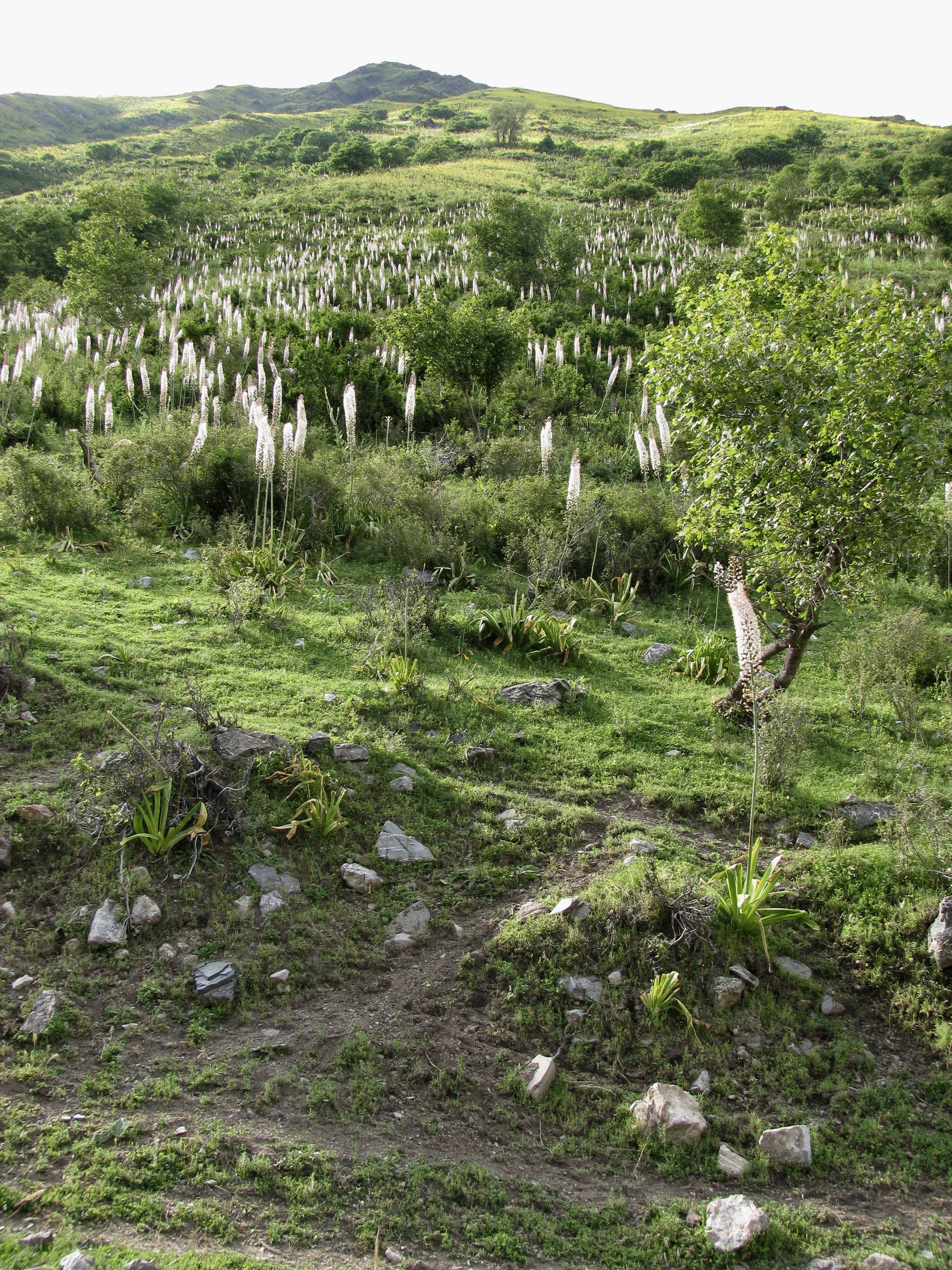
E. robustus flowering on SW slope of Fergana range, nr. Sary-Kyr pass, Kyrgyzstan

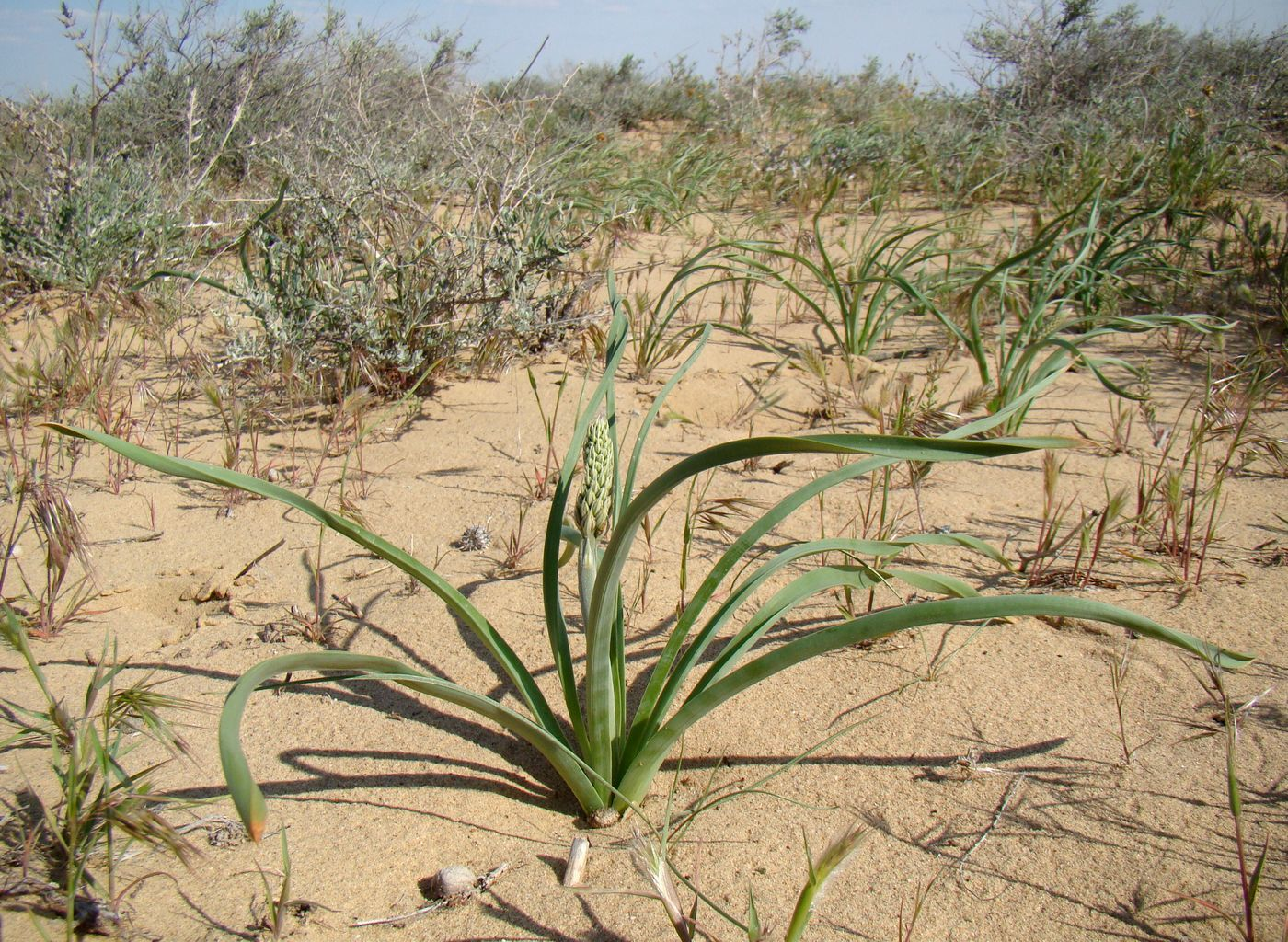
E. inderiensis developing flower spike starting to elongate, nr. Baikonur, Kazakhstan

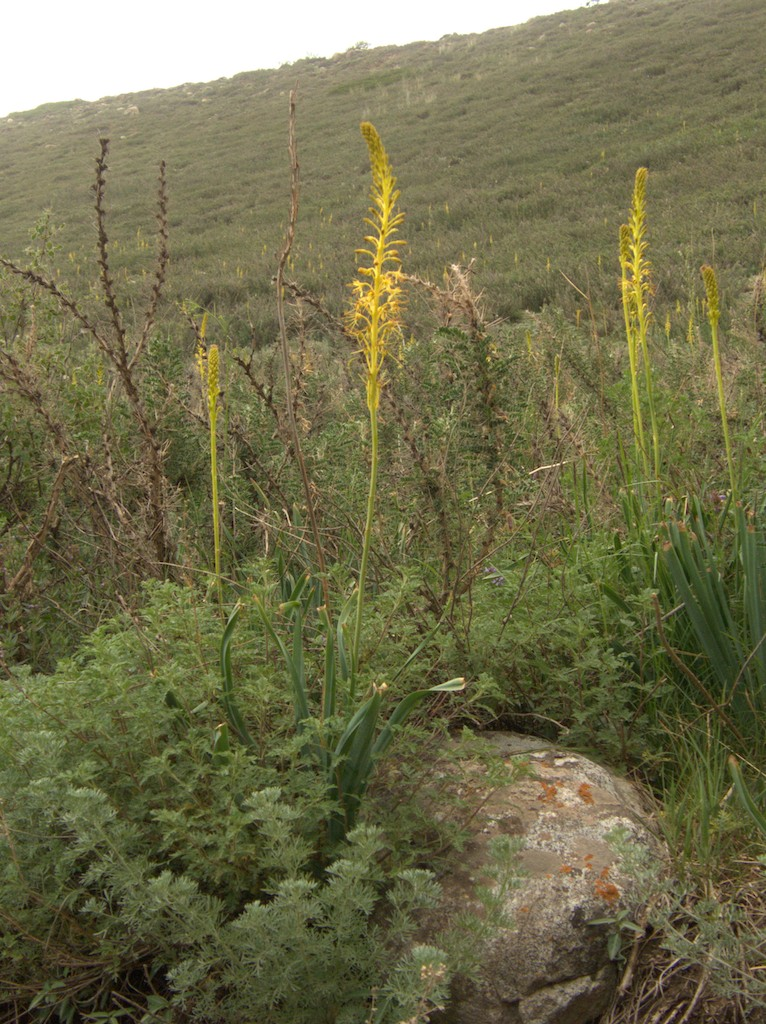
E. alaicus flowering on a grassy slope near Karakol, Kyrgyzstan in the Tien Shan range

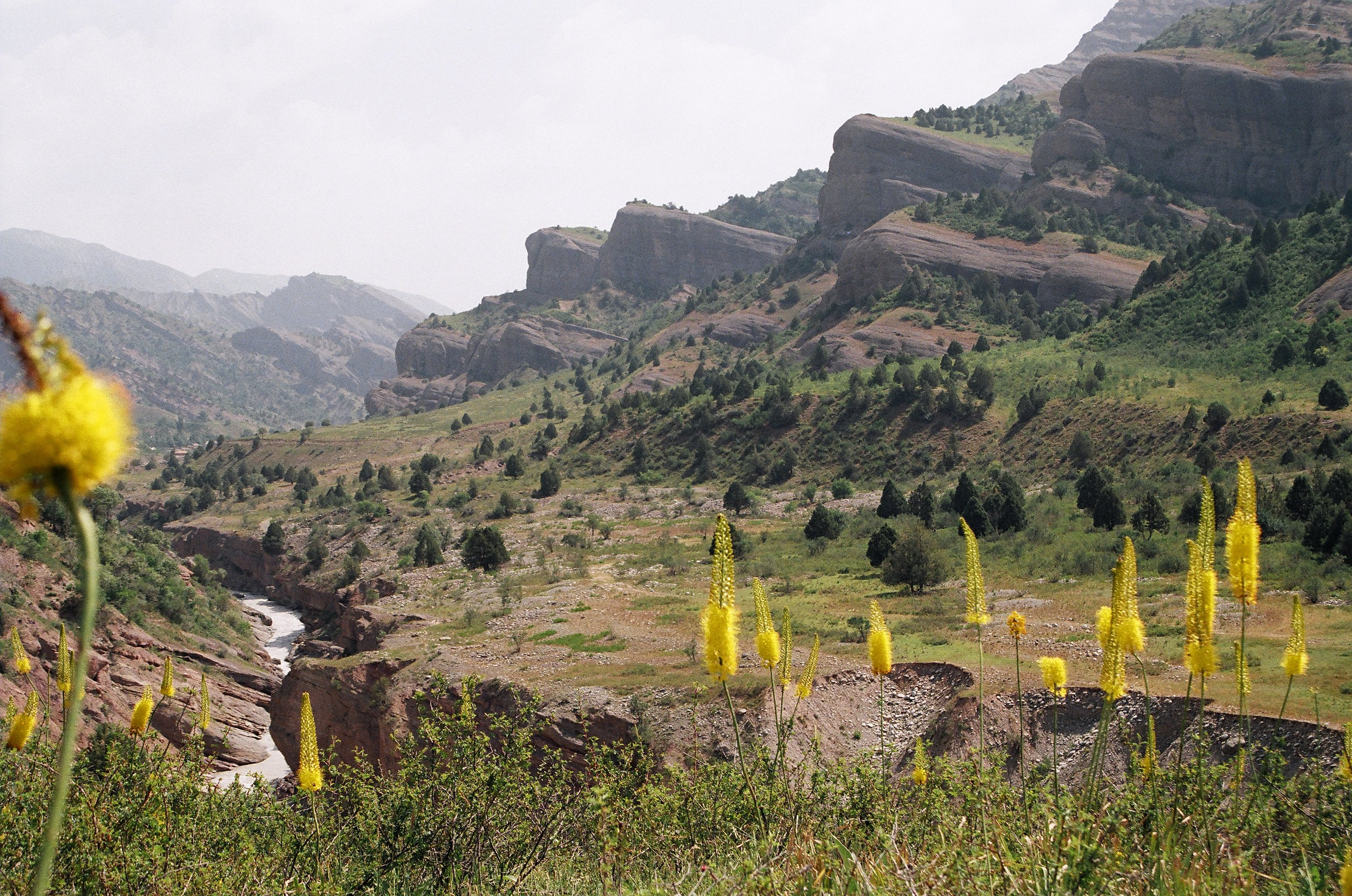
Stand of yellow-flowered E. sp. in bloom in April in a mountain river valley, Tajikistan

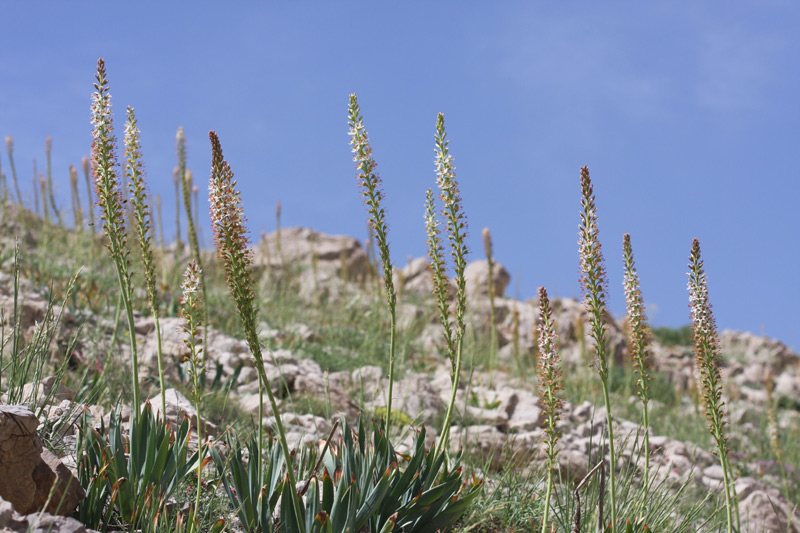
E. sp. (probably E. spectabilis) in flower and fruit on a dry slope in Israel

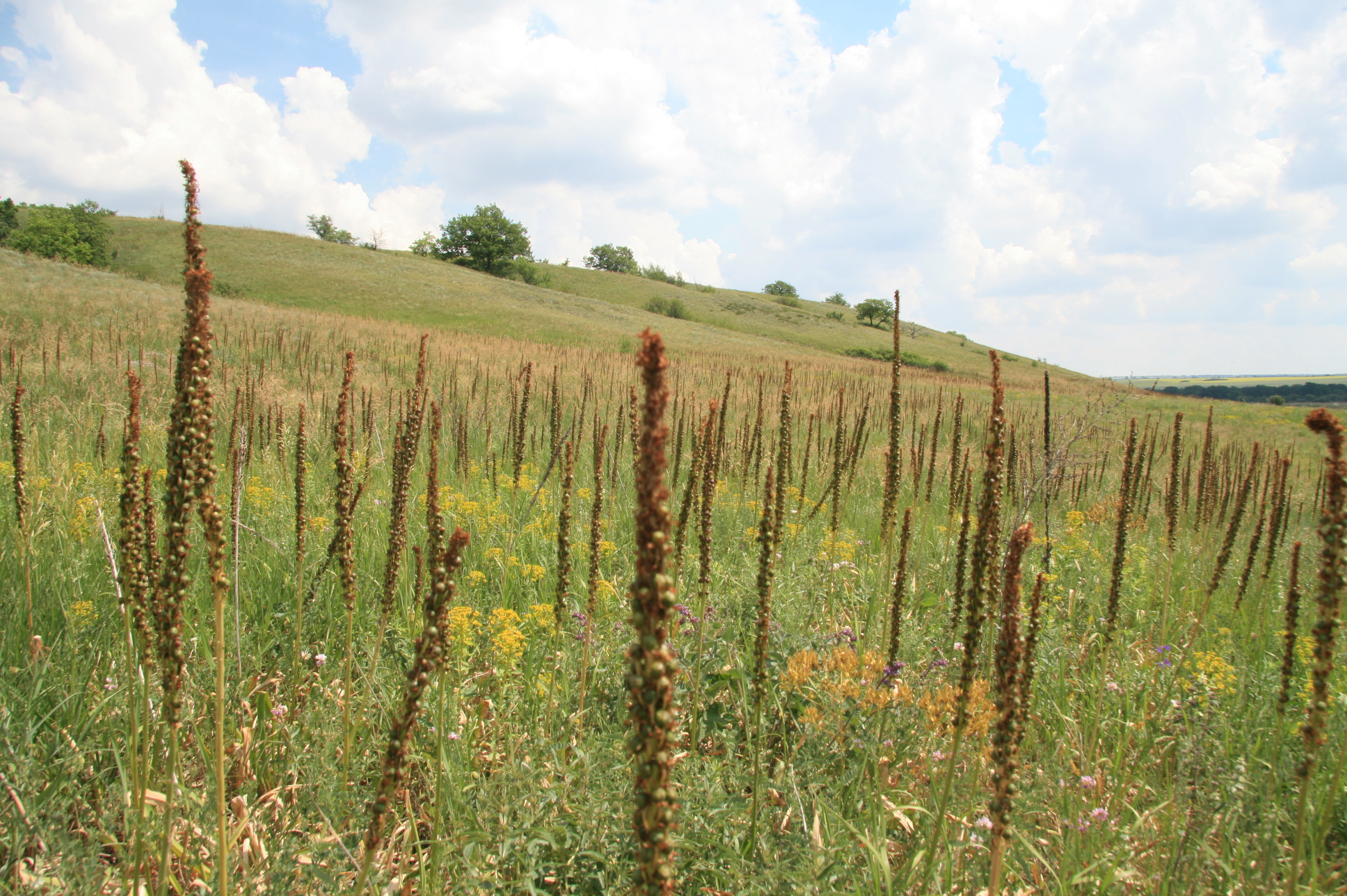
E. sp. - stand of plants in fruit, nature reserve, Luhansk Oblast Ukraine

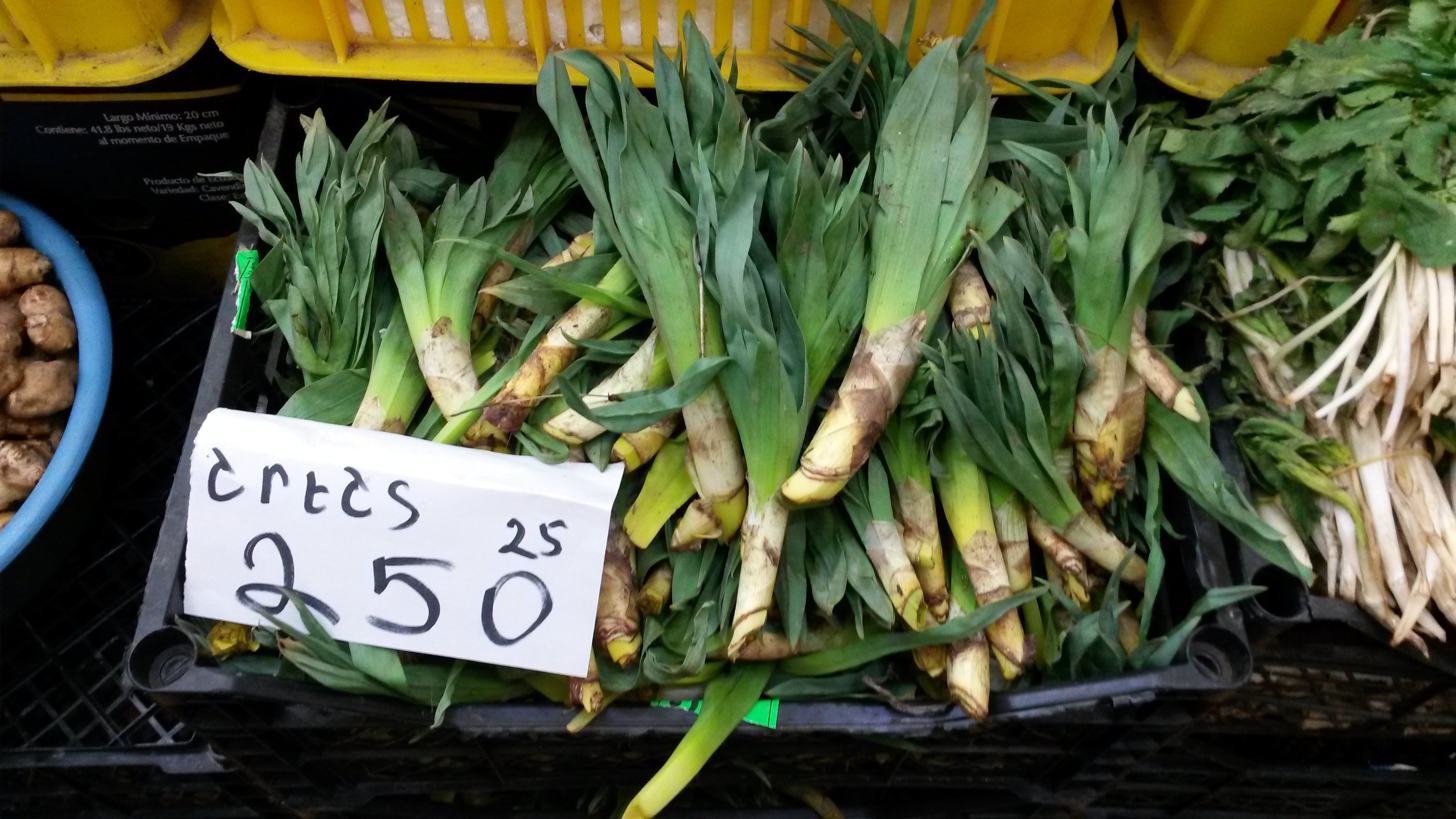
Young Eremurus leaf rosettes on sale as a leaf vegetable in an Armenian marketplace

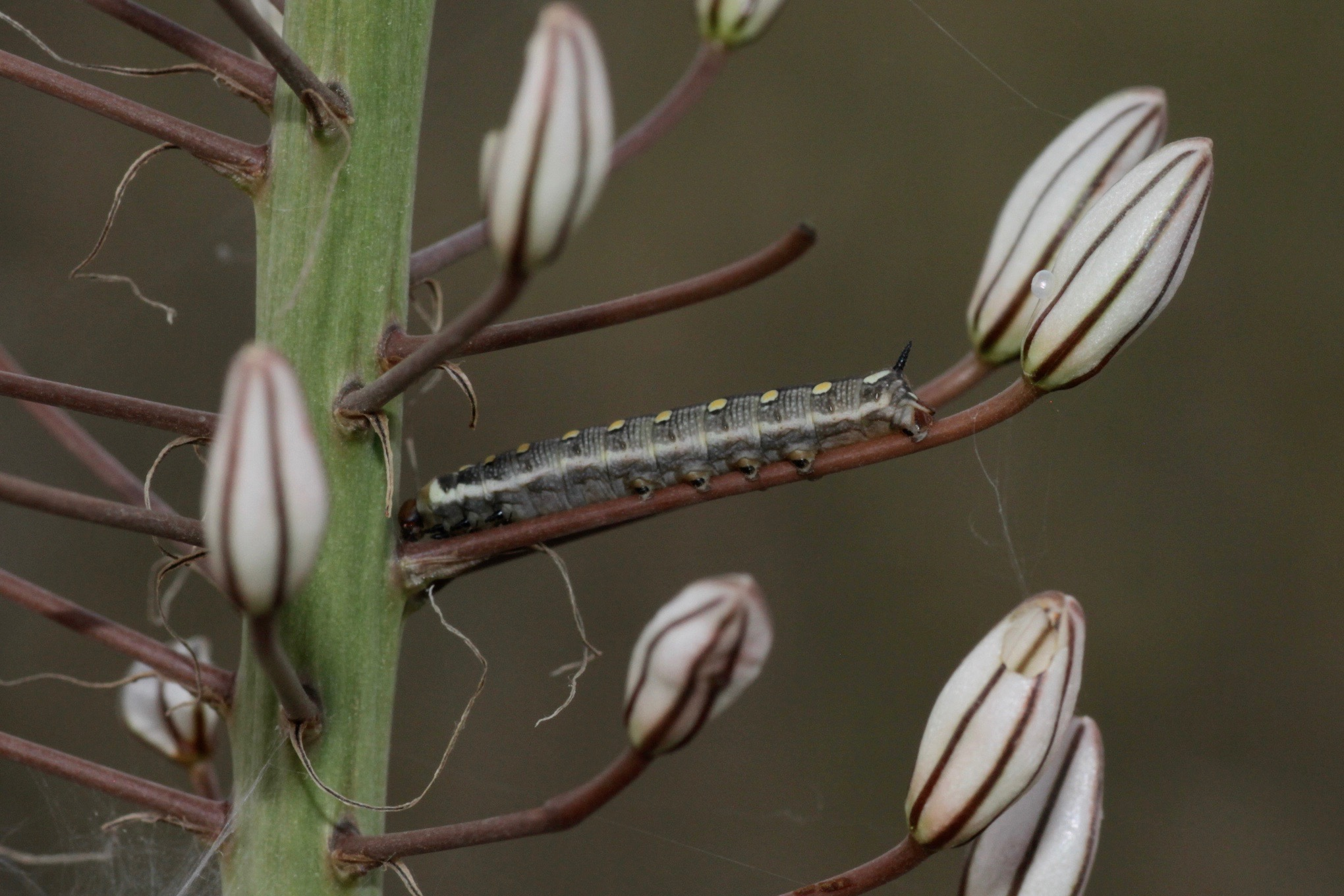
Close-up of flower buds of E. olgae with hawk moth larva

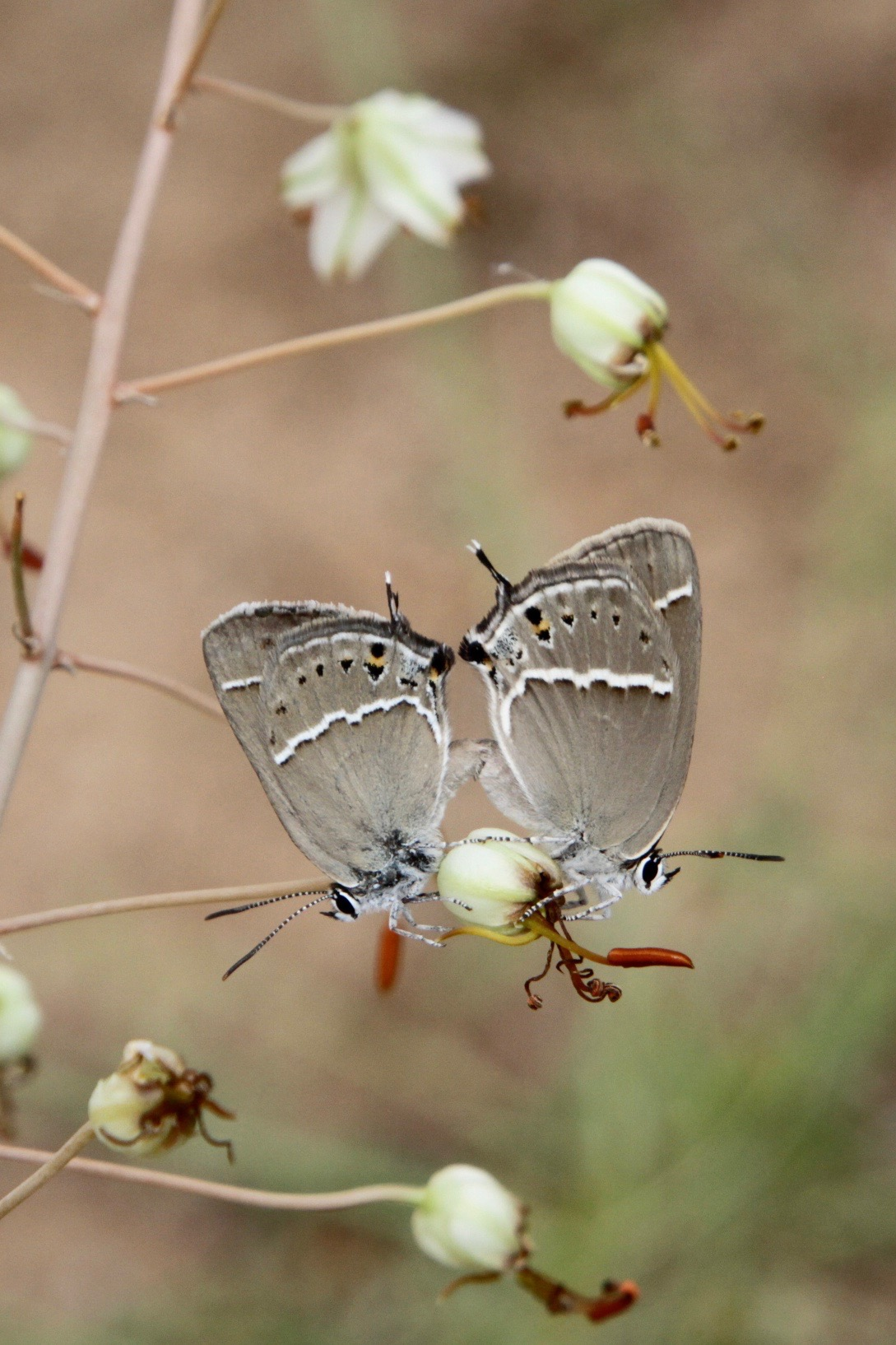
Satyrium mirabilis (see Satyrium) butterflies mating on E. sogdianus

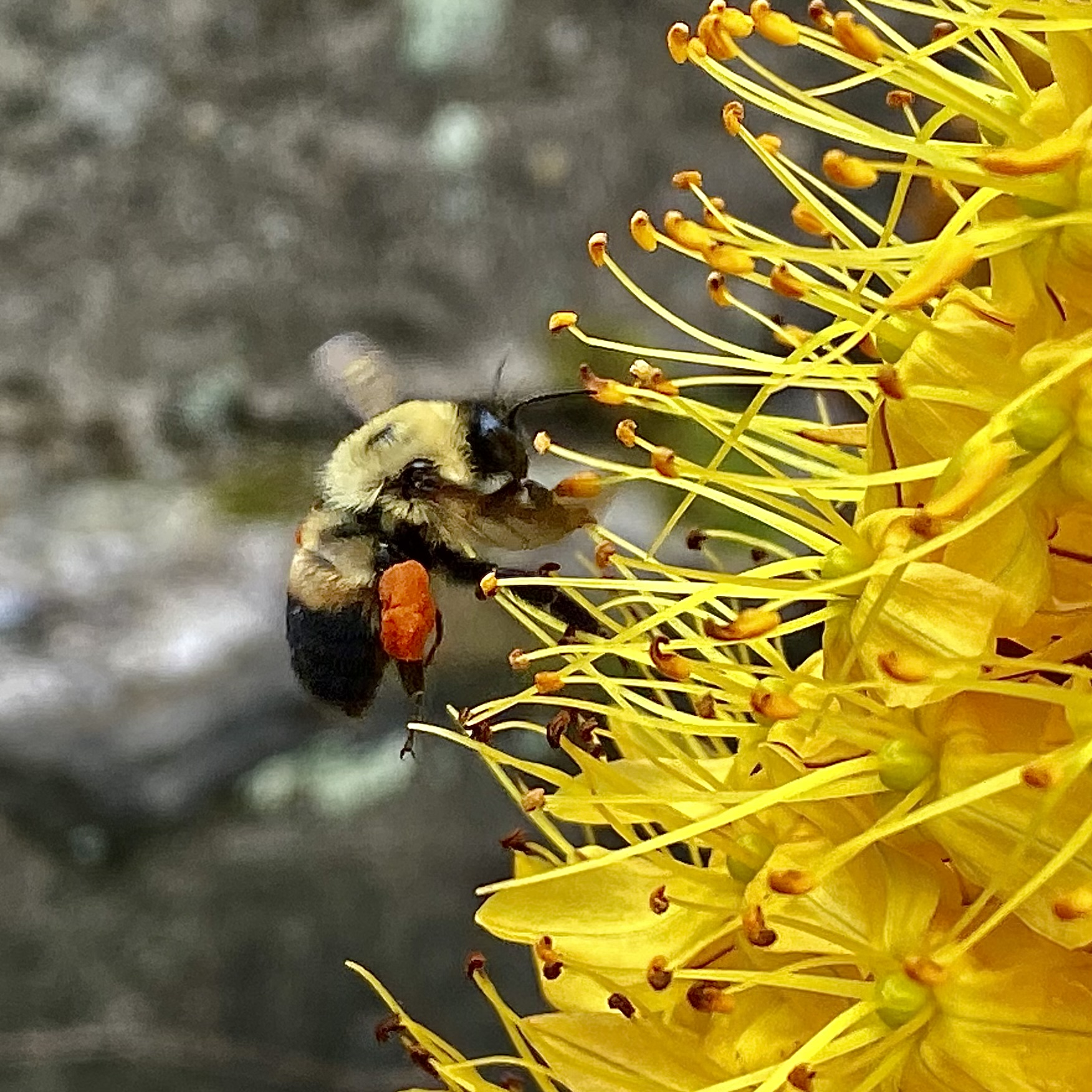
Bumblebee sp. pollinating flowers of E. stenophyllus var. stenophyllus in Wave Hill garden, Bronx

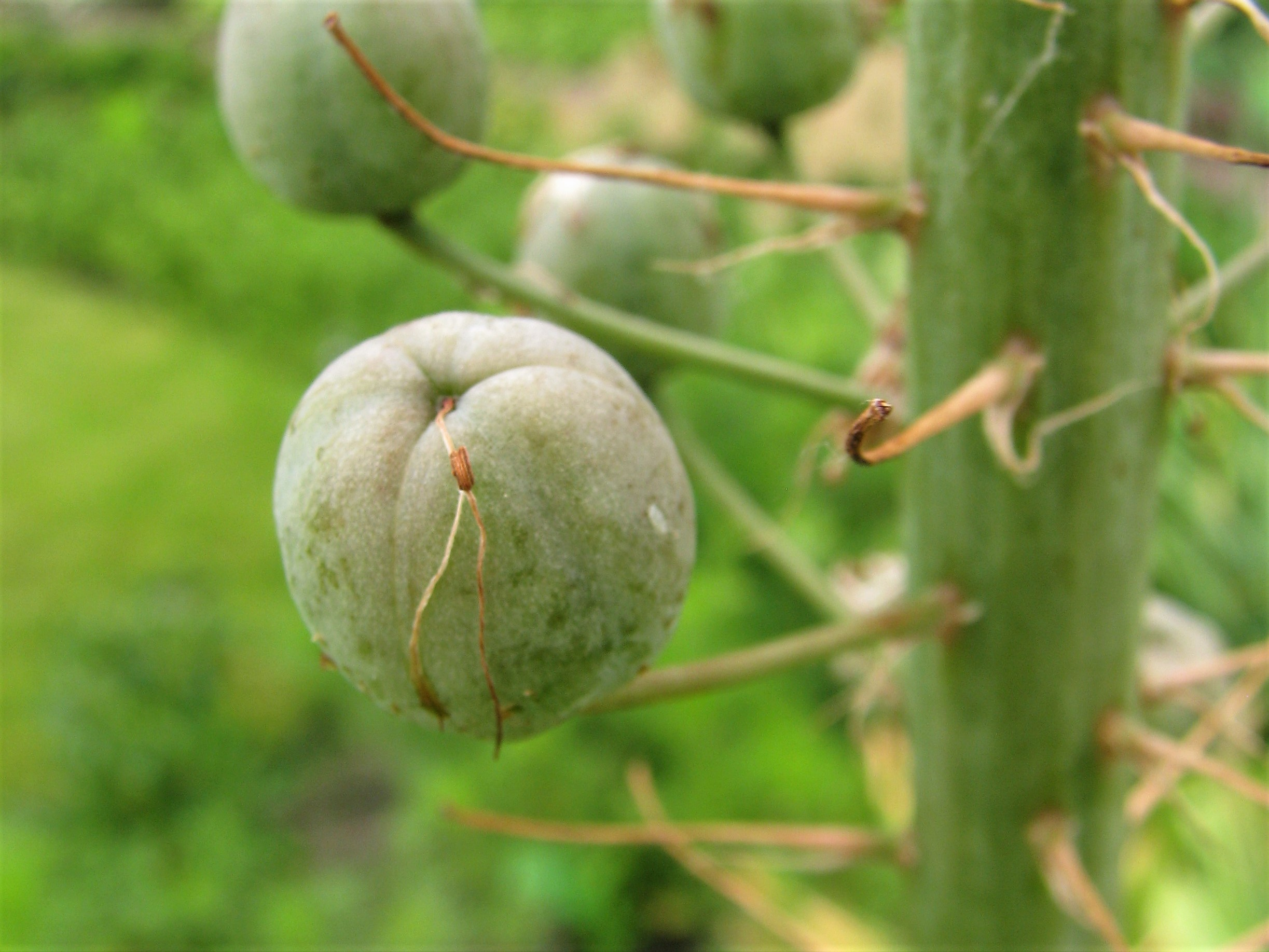
E. himalaicus ripening 3-valved seed capsule

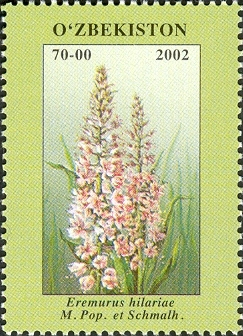
Uzbek postage stamp depicting E. hilariae (one of series devoted to the wildflowers of Uzbekistan)

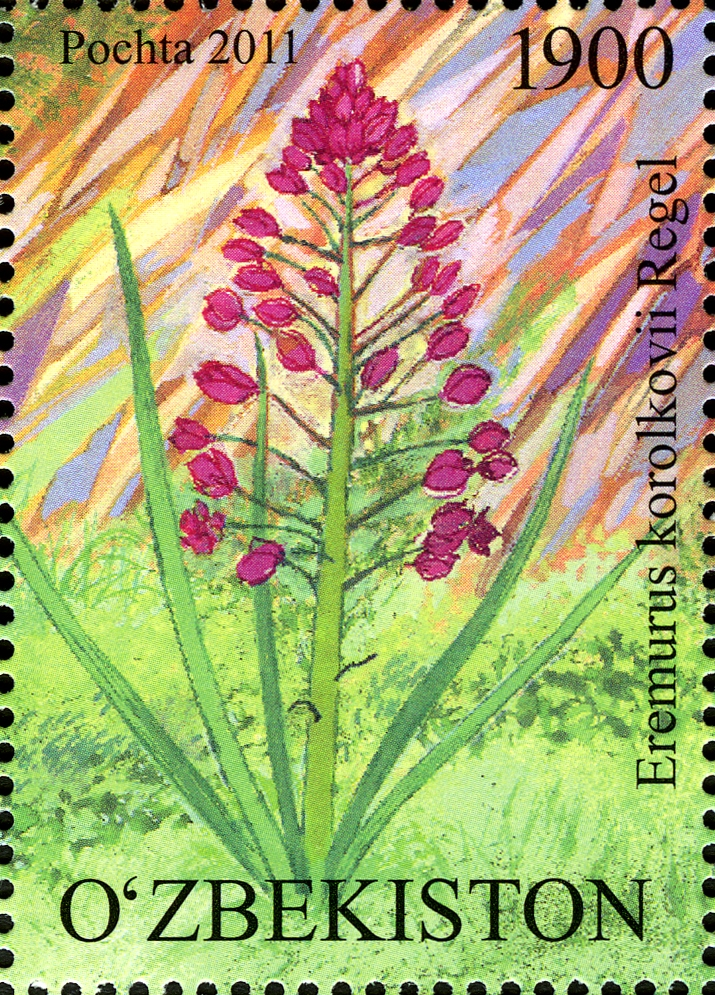
Uzbek postage stamp depicting
E. korolkowii

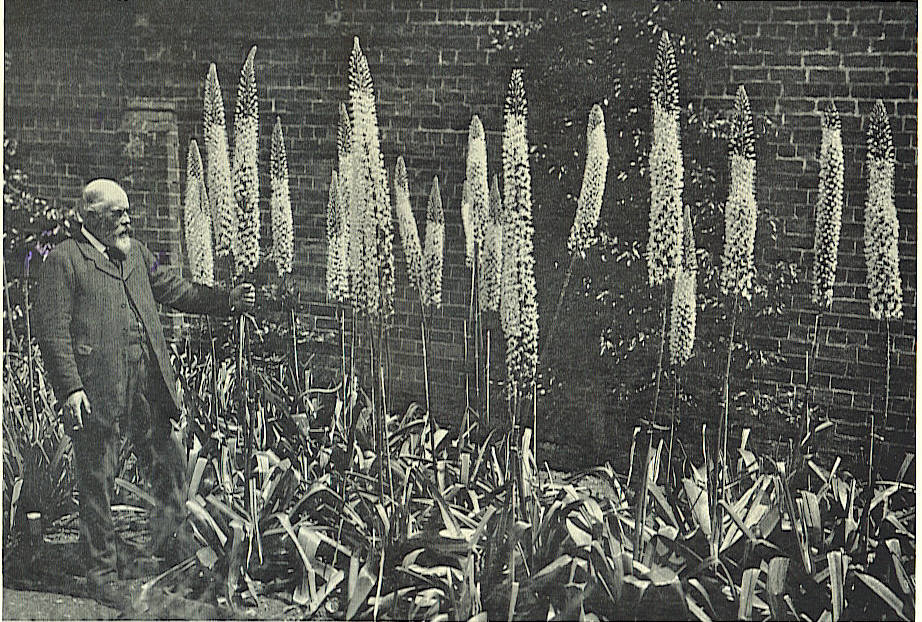
Plant hunter Henry John Elwes beside bed of E. aitchisonii, formerly named for him as E. elwesii /
elwesianus

== Bibliography ==
- "Eremurus". Advice. Royal Horticultural Society. 2017.
- "Eremurus". Plant information. Chicago Botanic Garden. 2017.
- "Eremurus". Pacific Bulb Society. 30 January 2014.
