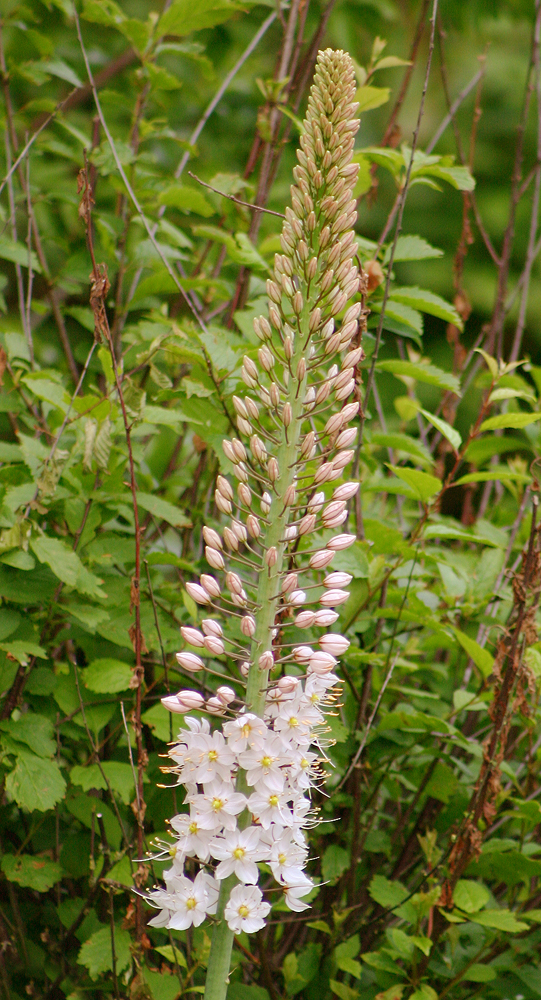
- E. robustus

Conservation status
- Least Concern (IUCN 3.1)

Scientific classification
- Kingdom: Plantae
- Clade: Tracheophytes
- Clade: Angiosperms
- Clade: Monocots
- Order: Asparagales
- Family: Asphodelaceae
- Subfamily: Asphodeloideae
- Genus: Eremurus
- Species: E. robustus

Binomial name
- Eremurus robustus (Regel) Regel

Synonyms
- Henningia robusta Regel

= Eremurus robustus =

Species of flowering plant

Eremurus robustus, the foxtail lily or giant desert candle, is a species of flowering plant in the asphodel family, native to the Tien Shan and Pamir Mountains in Central Asia, that is often used as an ornamental plant.

It is a very tall, narrow plant with a stem 6–10 ft (1.8–3.0 m) high, and leaves up to 48 in (120 cm) in length and 4 in (10 cm) in width - the widest in its genus. The deciduous leaves can vary in colour from bright green to bluish-green. The inflorescence grows to 4 ft (1.2 m) in length and is covered with many deep to pale pink or white flowers, 4 cm (1.6 in) across. At the base of each flower is a brown blotch with a green keel. The pedicels of the flowers are longest in those at the base of the inflorescence, decreasing in length toward its tip, while the flowers themselves, numbering some 700 to 800 per inflorescence, begin to bloom in June. By the time of flowering, the leaves will usually have already shrivelled.

The Latin specific epithet robustus means "sturdy, growing strongly" (the species is the largest of its genus).

The plant was introduced from Central Asia to Europe and North America in 1874 and is popular in gardens. However some may find the plant to be too tall for normal gardens. It prefers sandy, well-drained soil and full sun.

In cultivation in the UK this plant has gained the Royal Horticultural Society's Award of Garden Merit.

== Gallery ==
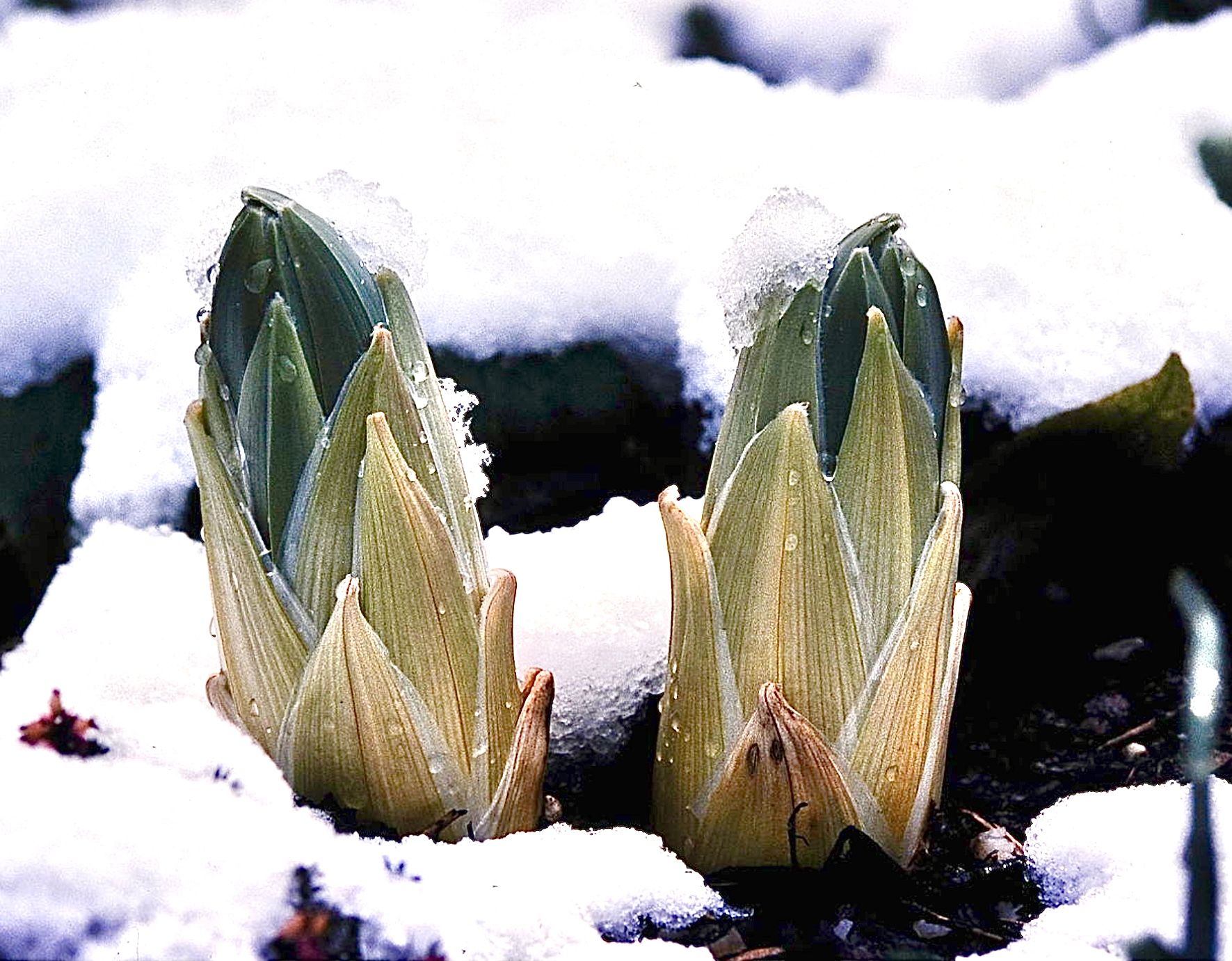
Leaf rosettes, in bud, at time of first emergence from snowy ground

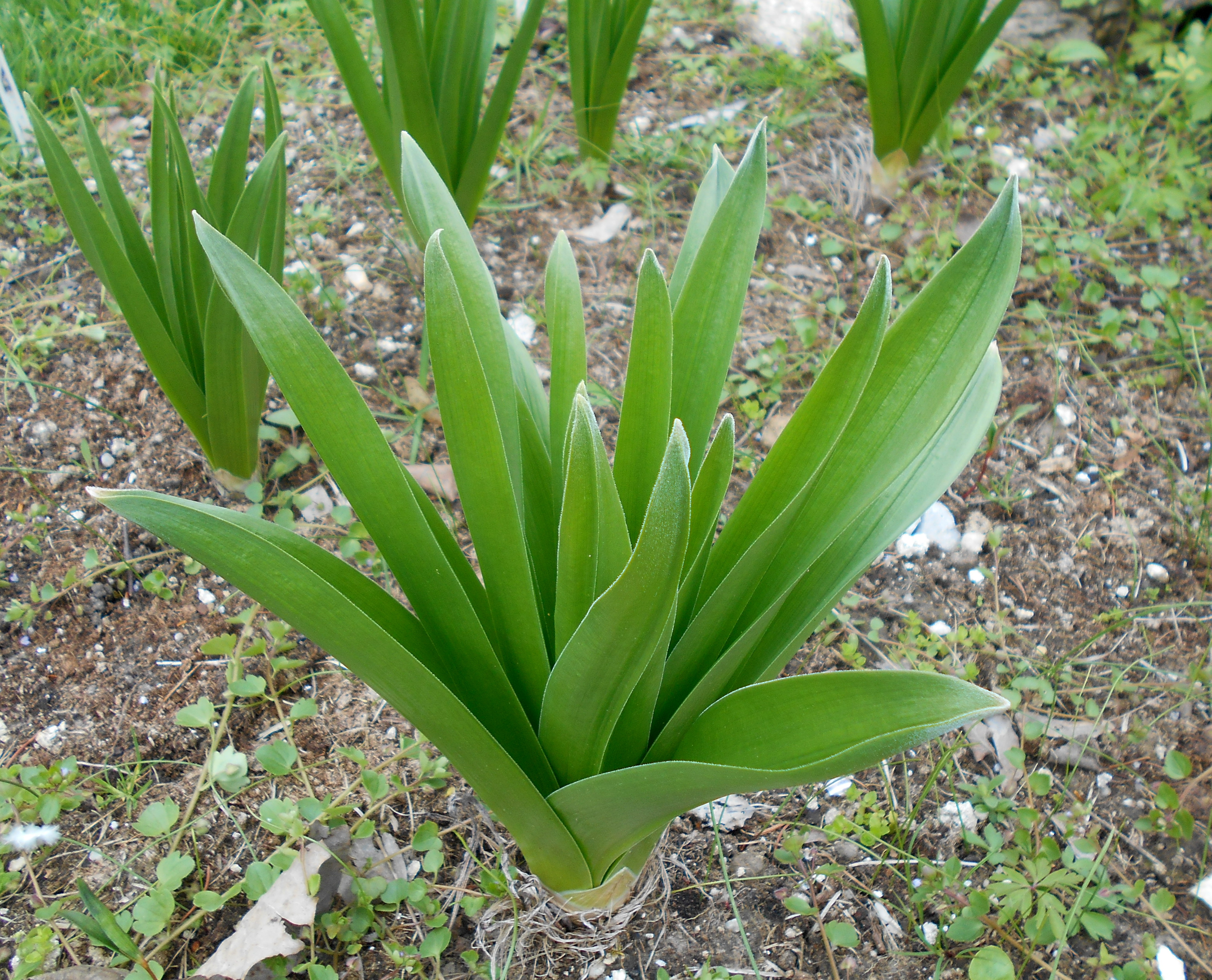
Young, developing leaf rosettes, Lublin Botanic Garden

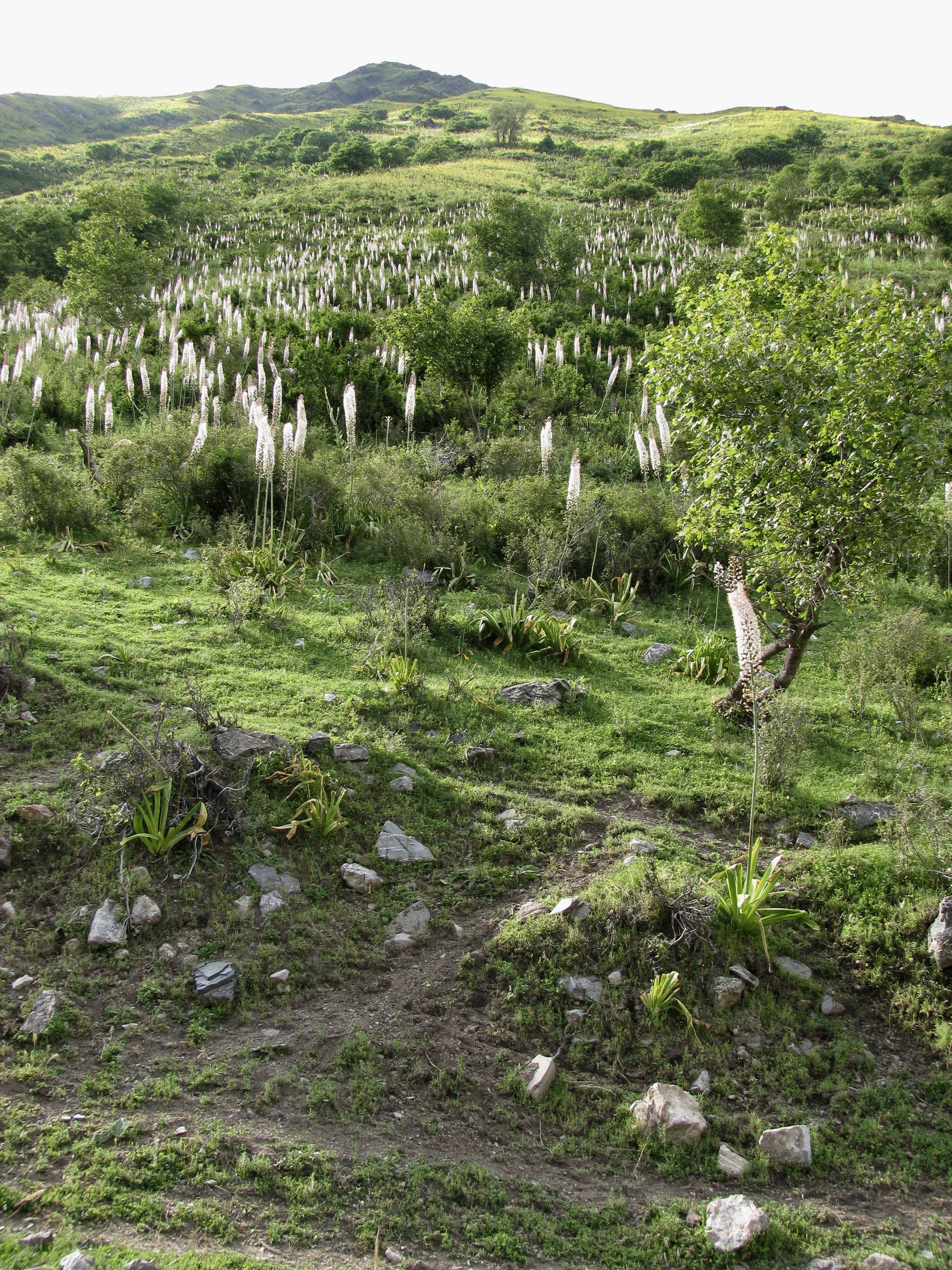
Large stand of wild plants, upland pasture, SW slope of Fergana range, bordering road to Sary-Kyr pass, Kyrgyzstan

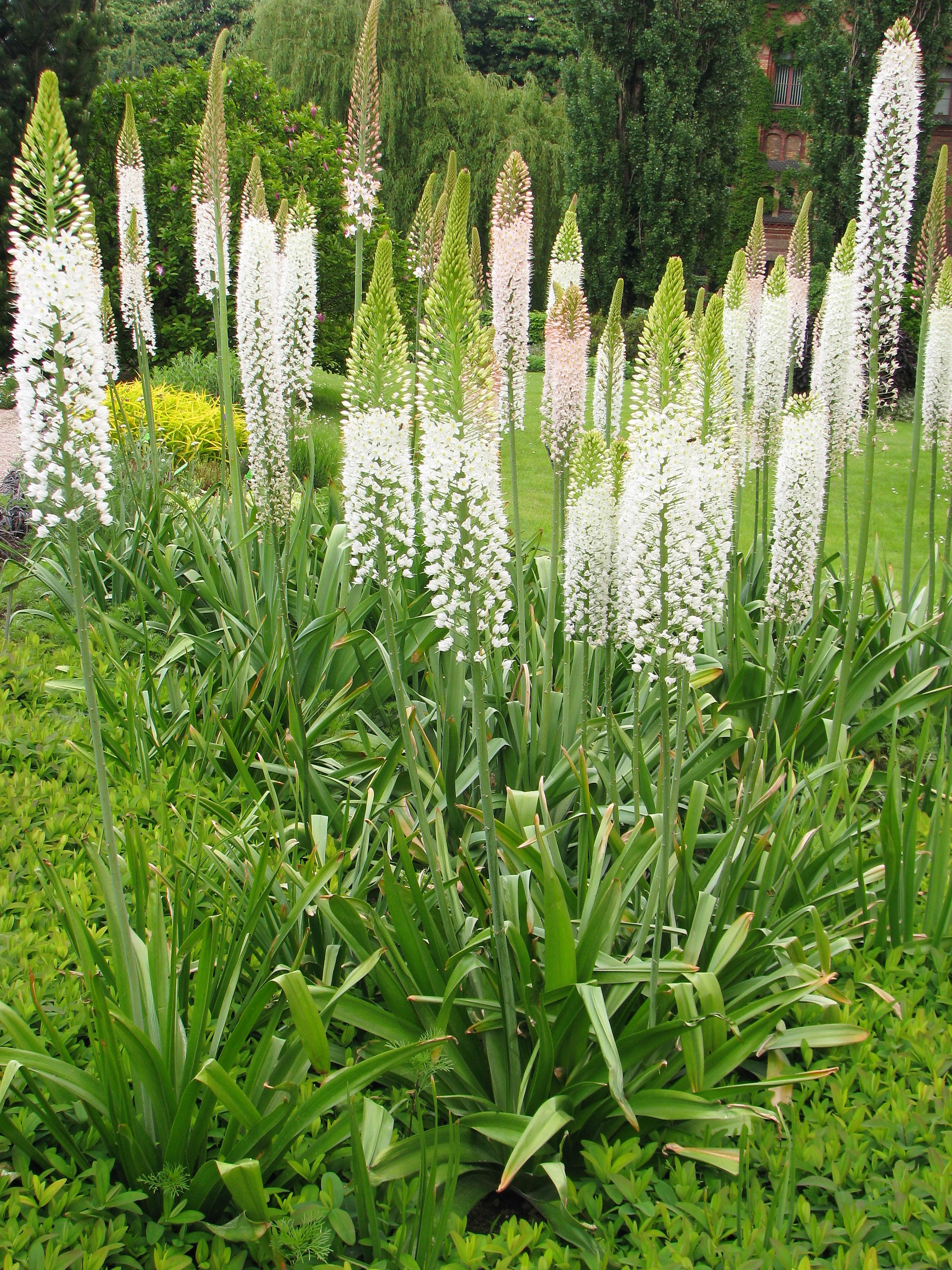
Planting of cultivated specimens, Wrocław Botanic Gardens

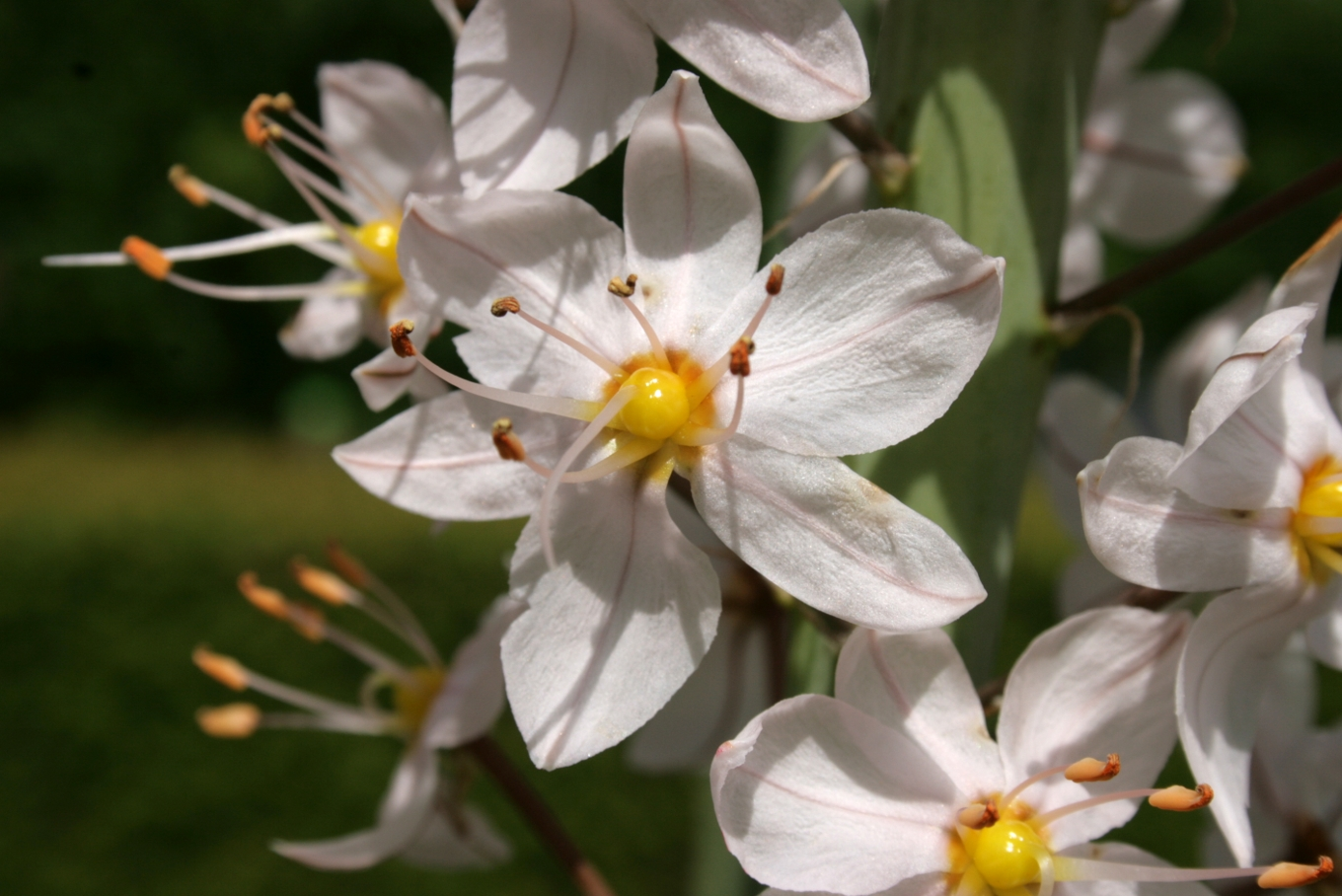
Close-up of individual flowers, full-face

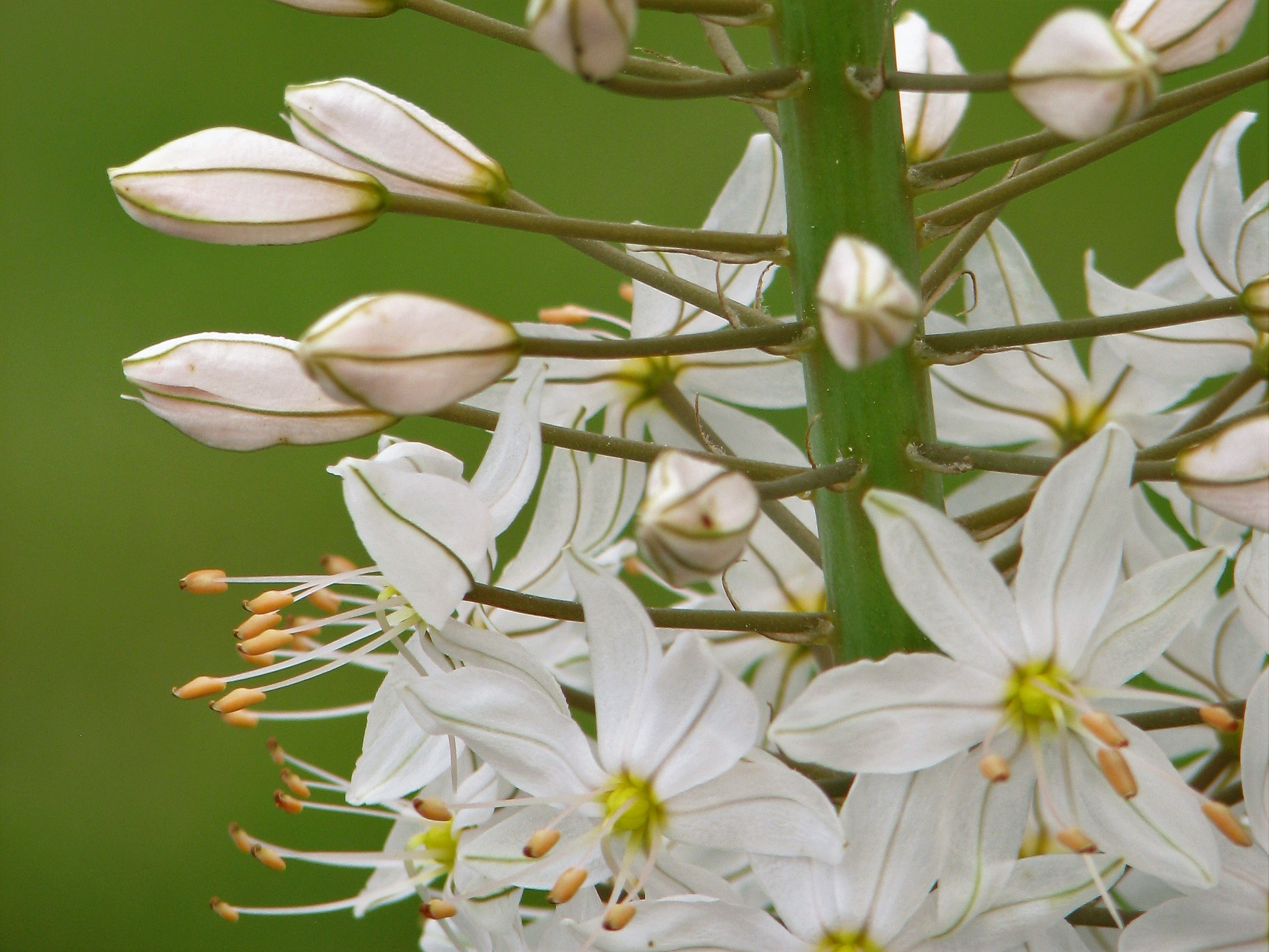
Close-up of section of flower spike, showing buds and flowers in profile

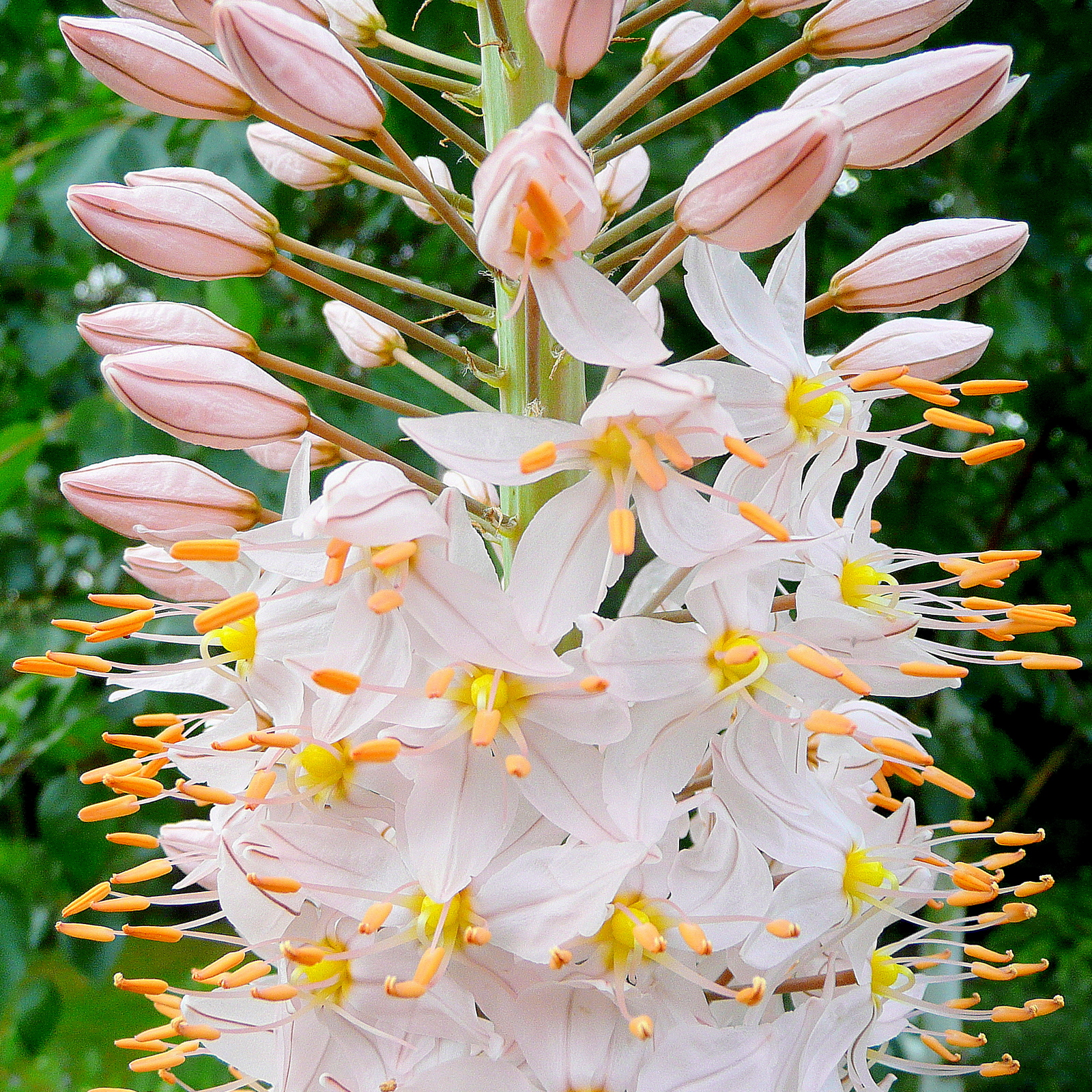
Section of flower spike of pink-flowered form

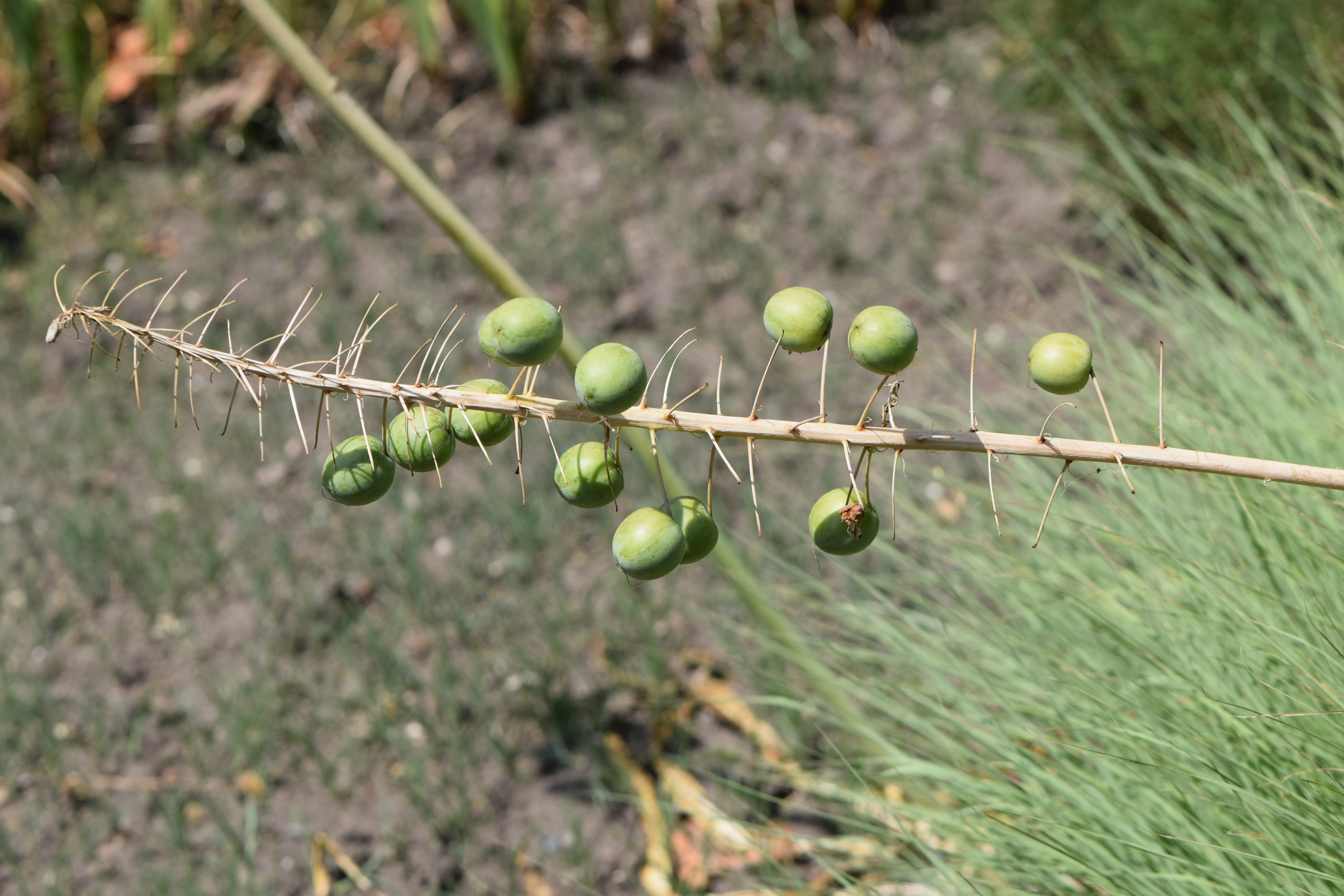
Section of withered flower spike bearing still green, but almost ripe, seed capsules, Halle Botanic Garden
