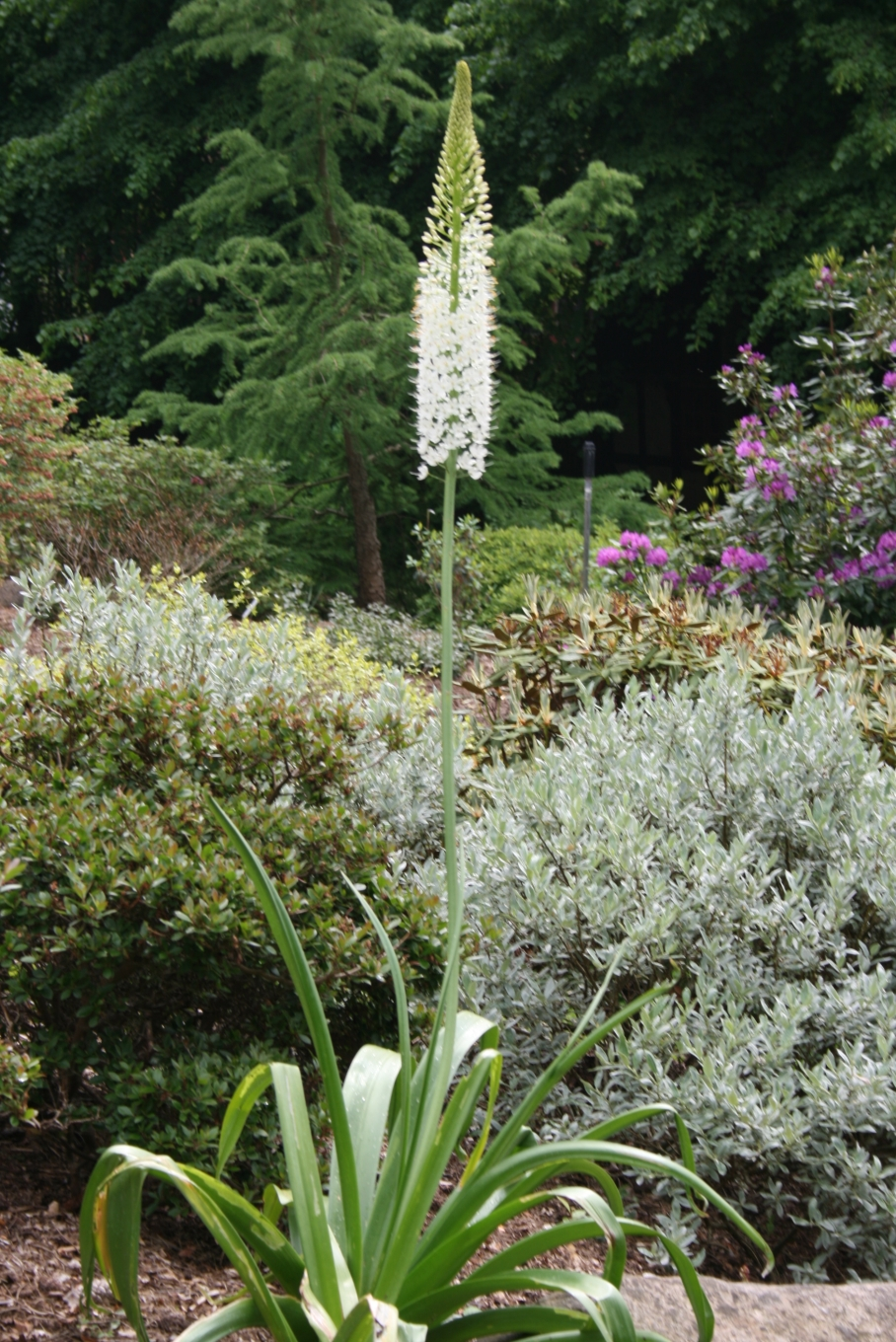
- In a garden setting
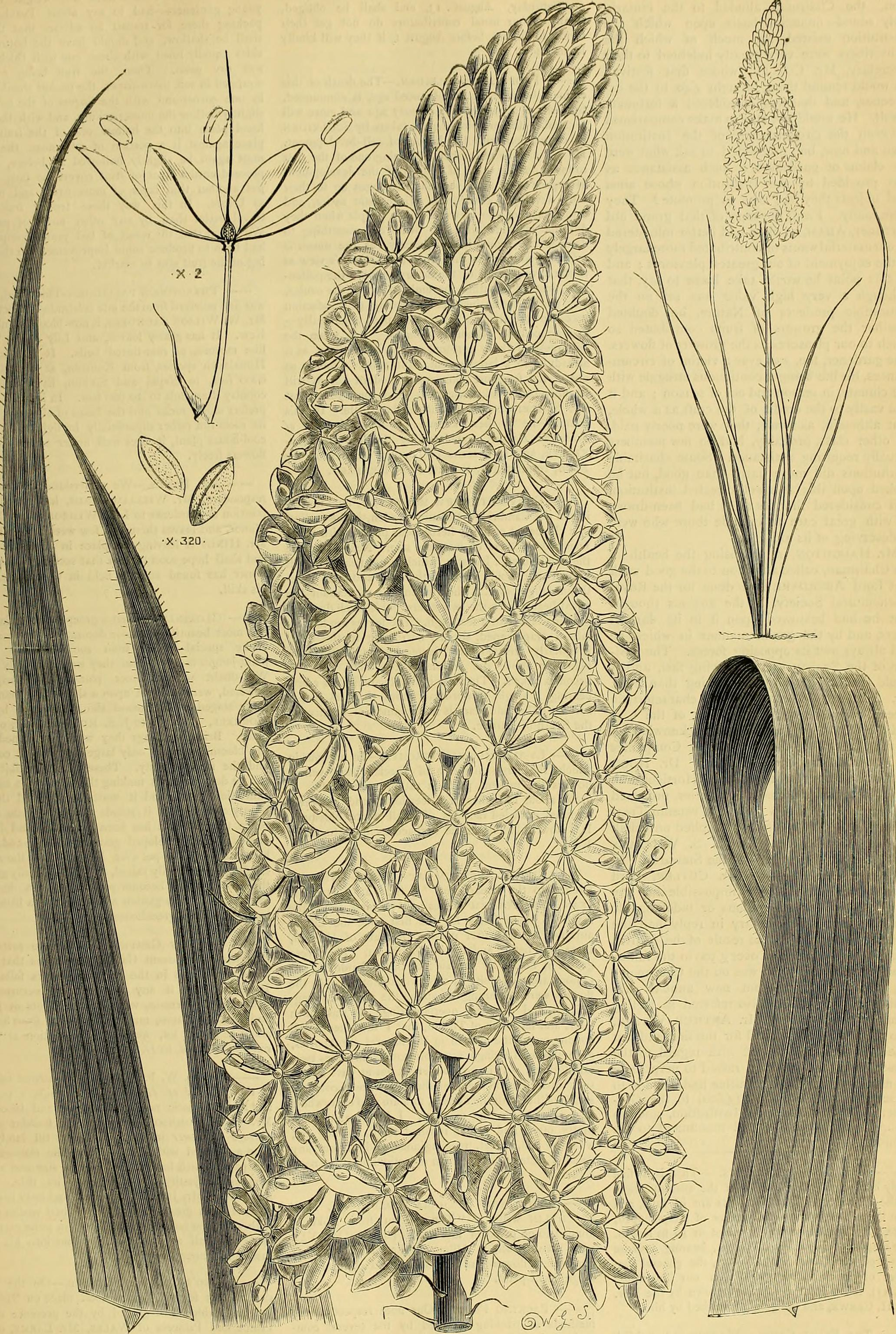
- Botanical illustration

Scientific classification
- Kingdom: Plantae
- Clade: Embryophytes
- Clade: Tracheophytes
- Clade: Angiosperms
- Clade: Monocots
- Order: Asparagales
- Family: Asphodelaceae
- Subfamily: Asphodeloideae
- Genus: Eremurus
- Species: E. himalaicus

Binomial name
- Eremurus himalaicus Baker

Synonyms
- Henningia himalaica (Baker) A.P.Khokhr.

= Eremurus himalaicus =

Species of flowering plant

Eremurus himalaicus, the Himalayan foxtail lily or white-flowered foxtail lily, is a species of flowering plant in the family Asphodelaceae. It is native to Afghanistan, Pakistan, and the western Himalayas. It is useful in the garden as a tall accent plant, as its flower spike can reach from 6 ft (2 m) to 8 ft (2.5 m).
