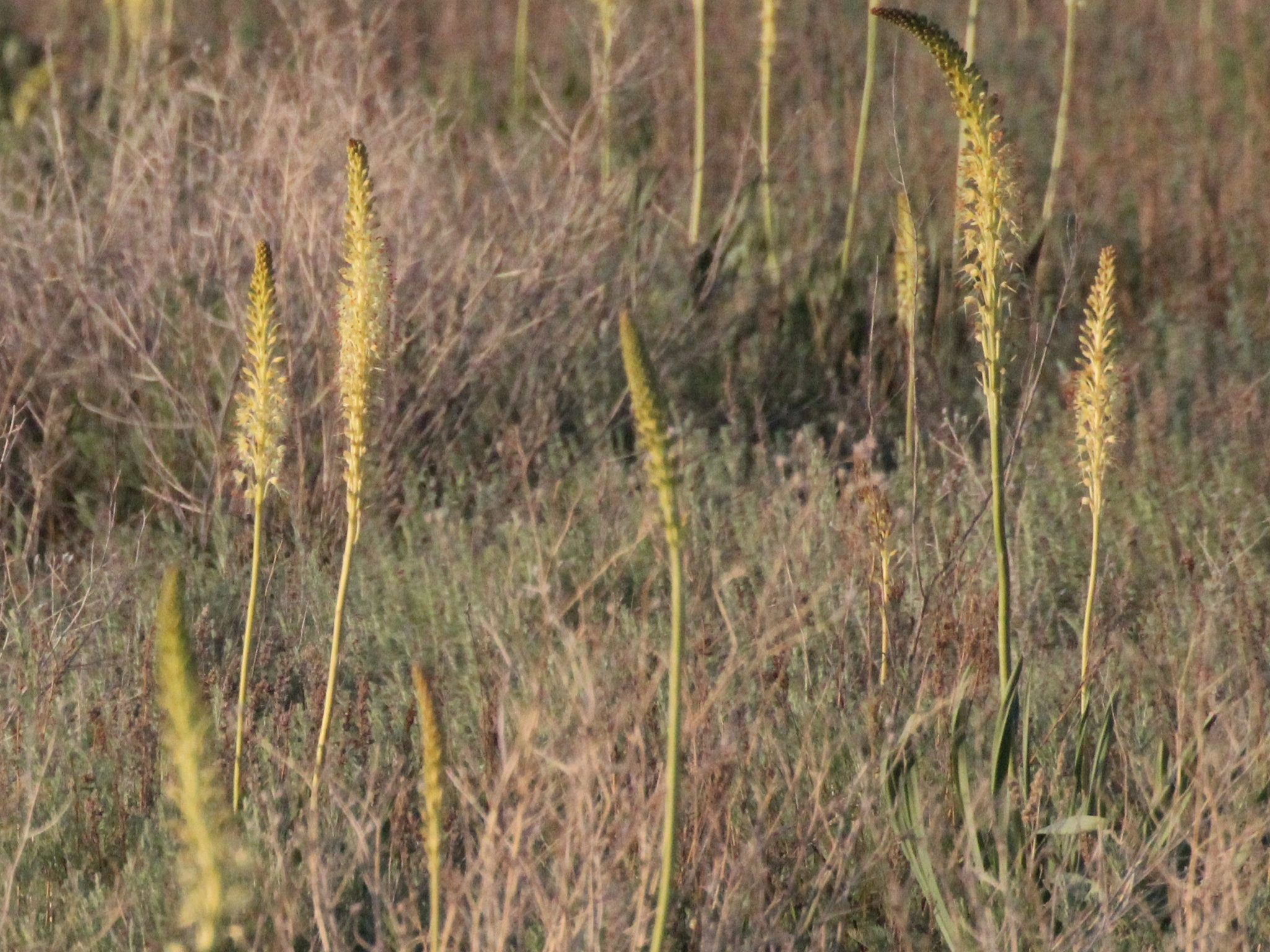

Scientific classification
- Kingdom: Plantae
- Clade: Tracheophytes
- Clade: Angiosperms
- Clade: Monocots
- Order: Asparagales
- Family: Asphodelaceae
- Subfamily: Asphodeloideae
- Genus: Eremurus
- Species: E. altaicus

Binomial name
- Eremurus altaicus (Pall.) Steven

Synonyms
- Asphodelus altaicus Pall.; Asphodelus sibiricus Siev.; Eremurus altaicus var. asperulus Regel; Eremurus spectabilis Ledeb., nom. illeg.

= Eremurus altaicus =

Species of plant

Eremurus altaicus is a species of flowering plant in the family Asphodelaceae, native from Siberia to Mongolia. It was first described by Peter Simon von Pallas in 1779 as Asphodelus altaicus.

== Distribution ==
Eremurus altaicus has a wide native distribution in Central Asia (Kazakhstan, Kyrgyzstan, Tajikistan and Uzbekistan), the Altai Krai in Siberia, Mongolia, and Xinjiang in China.
