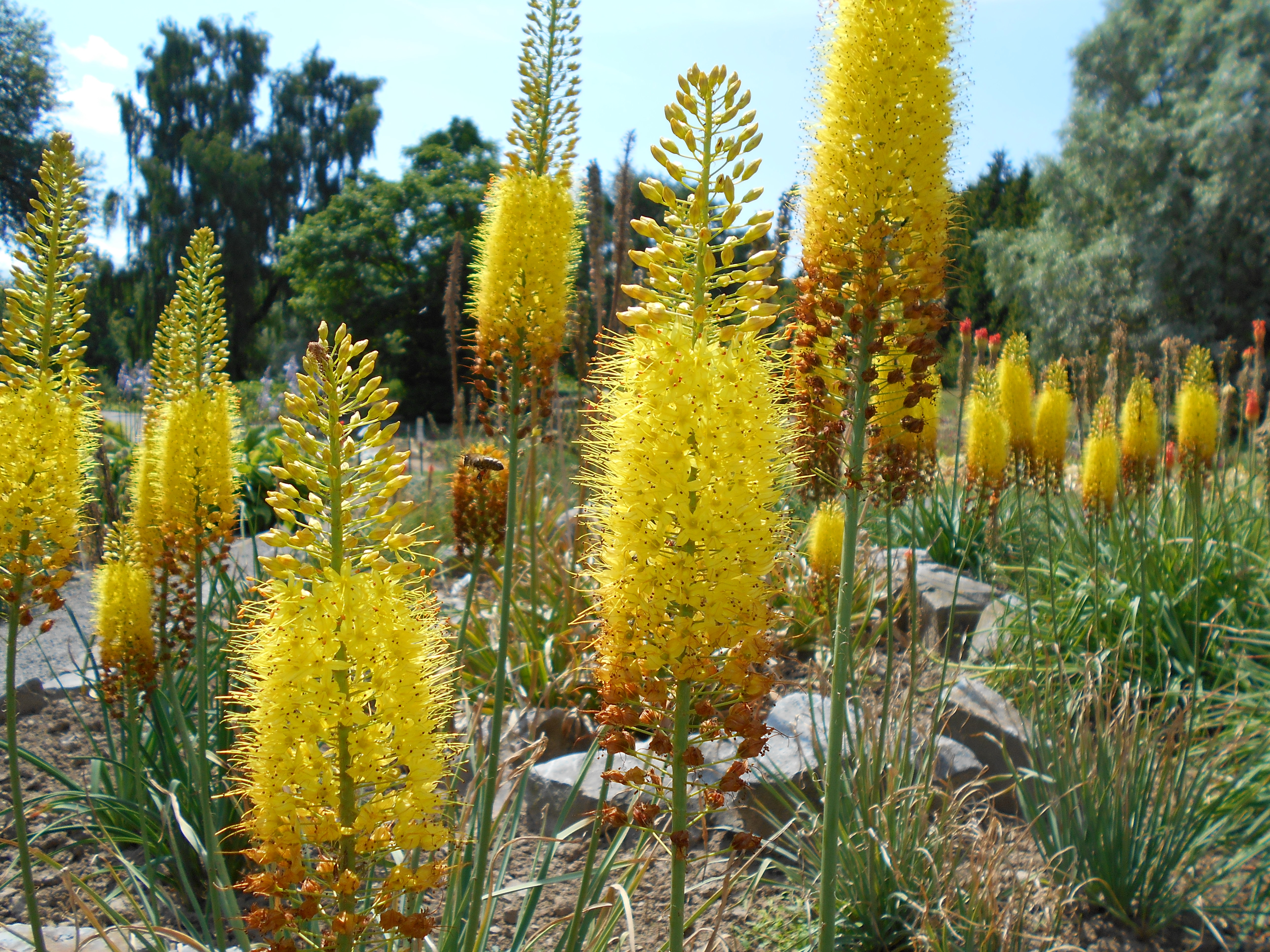

Scientific classification
- Kingdom: Plantae
- Clade: Tracheophytes
- Clade: Angiosperms
- Clade: Monocots
- Order: Asparagales
- Family: Asphodelaceae
- Subfamily: Asphodeloideae
- Genus: Eremurus
- Species: E. stenophyllus

Binomial name
- Eremurus stenophyllus (Boiss. & Buhse) Baker

Synonyms
- Ammolirion stenophyllum Boiss. & Buhse; Eremurus bungei; Eremurus stenophyllus var. bungei; Eremurus stenophyllus subsp. stenophyllus; Henningia stenophylla (Boiss. & Buhse) A.P.Khokhr.

= Eremurus stenophyllus =

Species of plant

Eremurus stenophyllus, the narrow-leaved foxtail lily, is a species of flowering plant in the family Asphodelaceae, native to central Asia.

== Description ==
It is an herbaceous perennial growing to 1 m (3.3 ft) tall and broad, with narrow strap-shaped leaves. Racemes composed of small yellow flowers appear in summer. The flowers darken to brown from the base, forming a two-tone effect with age.

== Taxonomy ==
Two subspecies are listed, E. stenophyllus subsp. ambigens, and E. stenophyllus subsp. aurantiacus. The specific epithet stenophyllus is derived from the Greek stenos (narrow) and phyllon (leaf) to give "with narrow leaves".

== Horticulture ==
This plant is grown as a garden perennial for a sunny border, and has gained the Royal Horticultural Society's Award of Garden Merit. Though hardy down to −20 °C (−4 °F), in colder areas it benefits from the shelter of a wall.
