= Hyposmocoma diffusa =

Scientific classification
- Domain: Eukaryota
- Kingdom: Animalia
- Phylum: Arthropoda
- Class: Insecta
- Order: Lepidoptera
- Family: Cosmopterigidae
- Genus: Hyposmocoma
- Species: H. diffusa

Binomial name
- Hyposmocoma diffusa (Walsingham, 1907)

Synonyms
- Aphthonetus diffusa Walsingham, 1907

Species of moth

Hyposmocoma diffusa is a species of moth of the family Cosmopterigidae. It was first described by Lord Walsingham in 1907. It is endemic to the Hawaiian islands of Kauai and Maui. The type locality is Olinda, where it was collected at an elevation of 4,000 feet (1,200 m).
