= Hyposmocoma caecinervis =

Scientific classification
- Kingdom: Animalia
- Phylum: Arthropoda
- Class: Insecta
- Order: Lepidoptera
- Family: Cosmopterigidae
- Genus: Hyposmocoma
- Species: H. caecinervis

Binomial name
- Hyposmocoma caecinervis Meyrick, 1928

Species of moth

Hyposmocoma caecinervis is a species of moth of the family Cosmopterigidae. It was first described by Edward Meyrick in 1928. It is endemic to the Hawaiian island of Oahu. The type locality is Mount Kaʻala.

The larvae feed on Smilax sandwicensis. They bore in the dead stems.
