= H. aspersa =

H. aspersa may refer to:

- Helix aspersa (now classified as Cornu aspersum), the garden snail, a pulmonate gastropod species
- Hogna aspersa, a large wolf spider species found in the United States
- Hyposmocoma aspersa, a moth species endemic to Oahu

== See also ==
- Aspersa
