= Hyposmocoma insinuatrix =

Scientific classification
- Kingdom: Animalia
- Phylum: Arthropoda
- Class: Insecta
- Order: Lepidoptera
- Family: Cosmopterigidae
- Genus: Hyposmocoma
- Species: H. insinuatrix

Binomial name
- Hyposmocoma insinuatrix Meyrick, 1928

Species of moth

Hyposmocoma insinuatrix is a species of moth of the family Cosmopterigidae. It was first described by Edward Meyrick in 1928. It is endemic to the Hawaiian island of Molokai. The type locality is Kainalu, where it was collected at an elevation between 2,000 and 3,000 feet (610 and 910 m).

The larvae feed on Smilax sandwicensis. They bore in dead wood. They do not make a case.
