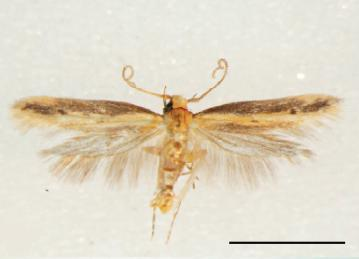

Scientific classification
- Kingdom: Animalia
- Phylum: Arthropoda
- Clade: Pancrustacea
- Class: Insecta
- Order: Lepidoptera
- Family: Cosmopterigidae
- Genus: Hyposmocoma
- Species: H. ipohapuu

Binomial name
- Hyposmocoma ipohapuu Kawahara & Rubinoff, 2012

= Hyposmocoma ipohapuu =

Species of moth

Hyposmocoma ipohapuu is a species of moth of the family Cosmopterigidae. It is known only from Volcano Village on Hawaii. It is probably restricted to the rainforest areas around Hawaii Volcanoes National Park. The elevation for the type locality is approximately 1,200 metres (3,900 ft).

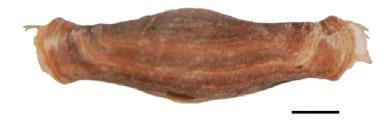
Larval case

The length of the forewings is 5 millimetres (0.20 in) for males and 5.8 millimetres (0.23 in) for females. Adults have a forewing pattern that differs from any other described species in the genus Hyposmocoma. It consists of a wide pale yellow band along the anal margin of the forewing, curving proximally at the wing margin towards the costa. There is a small, round, dark brown mark present approximately two thirds of the way from the wing base to the apex.

The mature larval case is 5.9–6.6 millimetres (0.23–0.26 in) in length and 1.2–1.5 millimetres (0.047–0.059 in) wide, smooth with banding that follows the length of the case. The case widens slightly at both ends. Case-making larvae were collected on the abaxial surface of old fronds of Cibotium glaucum. The habit of residing in old tree fern fronds, still attached to the stump, is typical of several purse case species including Hyposmocoma filicivora.

== Etymology ==
The species is named ipohapuu, which means tree-fern lover in Hawaiian.
