= Hyposmocoma municeps =

Scientific classification
- Domain: Eukaryota
- Kingdom: Animalia
- Phylum: Arthropoda
- Class: Insecta
- Order: Lepidoptera
- Family: Cosmopterigidae
- Genus: Hyposmocoma
- Species: H. municeps

Binomial name
- Hyposmocoma municeps (Walsingham, 1907)

Synonyms
- Neelysia municeps Walsingham, 1907

Species of moth

Hyposmocoma municeps is a species of moth of the family Cosmopterigidae. It was first described by Lord Walsingham in 1907. It is endemic to the Hawaiian islands of Kauai and Maui. The type locality is Olinda, where it was collected at an altitude of 4,000 feet (1,200 m).
