= Hyposmocoma papahanau =

Scientific classification
- Kingdom: Animalia
- Phylum: Arthropoda
- Clade: Pancrustacea
- Class: Insecta
- Order: Lepidoptera
- Family: Cosmopterigidae
- Genus: Hyposmocoma
- Species: H. papahanau

Binomial name
- Hyposmocoma papahanau Schmitz and Rubinoff, 2009

Species of moth

Hyposmocoma papahanau is a species of moth of the family Cosmopterigidae. It is endemic to Nīhoa, Northwestern Hawaiian Islands. The type locality is Miller Canyon.

The wingspan is about 8.8 mm.

The larval case is burrito-shaped and 4.5–8.7 mm in length. It is similar to that of Hyposmocoma nihoa.

Adults were reared from case-making larvae. Larvae were collected on the ground.
