= Hyposmocoma wailua =

Scientific classification
- Kingdom: Animalia
- Phylum: Arthropoda
- Clade: Pancrustacea
- Class: Insecta
- Order: Lepidoptera
- Family: Cosmopterigidae
- Genus: Hyposmocoma
- Species: H. wailua

Binomial name
- Hyposmocoma wailua P. Schmitz & Rubinoff, 2011

Species of moth

Hyposmocoma wailua is a species of moth of the family Cosmopterigidae. It is endemic to Kauai. The species belongs to the amphibious caterpillar guild of the genus Hyposmocoma.
