= Hyposmocoma elegans =

Scientific classification
- Domain: Eukaryota
- Kingdom: Animalia
- Phylum: Arthropoda
- Class: Insecta
- Order: Lepidoptera
- Family: Cosmopterigidae
- Genus: Hyposmocoma
- Species: H. elegans

Binomial name
- Hyposmocoma elegans (Walsingham, 1907)

Synonyms
- Aphthonetus elegans Walsingham, 1907

Species of moth

Hyposmocoma elegans is a species of moth of the family Cosmopterigidae. It was first described by Lord Walsingham in 1907. It is endemic to the Hawaiian island of Maui. The type locality is Olinda, where it was collected at an elevation of 4,000 feet (1,200 m).
