= Hyposmocoma catapyrrha =

Scientific classification
- Kingdom: Animalia
- Phylum: Arthropoda
- Class: Insecta
- Order: Lepidoptera
- Family: Cosmopterigidae
- Genus: Hyposmocoma
- Species: H. catapyrrha

Binomial name
- Hyposmocoma catapyrrha (Meyrick, 1935)

Synonyms
- Euperissus catapyrrha Meyrick, 1935

Species of moth

Hyposmocoma catapyrrha is a species of moth of the family Cosmopterigidae. It was first described by Edward Meyrick in 1935. It is endemic to the Hawaiian island of Maui. The type locality is Olinda.

The larvae feed on Rubus hawaiiensis.
