= Hyposmocoma waihohonu =

Scientific classification
- Kingdom: Animalia
- Phylum: Arthropoda
- Clade: Pancrustacea
- Class: Insecta
- Order: Lepidoptera
- Family: Cosmopterigidae
- Genus: Hyposmocoma
- Species: H. waihohonu

Binomial name
- Hyposmocoma waihohonu P. Schmitz & Rubinoff, 2011

Species of moth

Hyposmocoma waihohonu is a species of moth of the family Cosmopterigidae. It is endemic to Maui. The species belongs to the amphibious caterpillar guild of the genus Hyposmocoma.

== Taxonomy ==
Hyposmocoma waihohonu was formally described by the entomologists Patrick Schmitz and Daniel Rubinoff in 2011 based on an adult male collected from the Honolua stream on the Hawaiian island of Maui. The specific epithet is derived from the Hawaiian words for "deep" and "water" (hohonu and wai) and alludes to its habitat preferences.

== Description ==
Adult Hyposmocoma waihohonu have a wingspan of 8.4–9.7 mm (0.33–0.38 in). Both the dorsal and ventral surfaces of the forewing are largely dark brown to dark grey in color, marked by brown dots and whitish notches. The dorsal and ventral surfaces of the hindwing are dark grey and have brownish-grey edges. The cilia of the hindwing are cream, marked by a brown line at the base. The abdomen is brown or grey dorsally and whitish ventrally. The thorax and tegula are dark brown. The head is dark brown with a dark grey vertex and whitish frons. The labial palpus is dark brown on the dorsal surface and whitish on the ventral side The scape is dark brown and the legs are largely brown. Females differ from males only in their narrower antennae.

== Distribution and habitat ==
Hyposmocoma waihohonu is endemic to the Hawaiian island of Maui, where it has been recorded from the Iao Valley Stream, Waiehu stream, and Honolua stream, all of which are located on the western side of the island. Hyposmocoma waihohonu is one of a group of Hawaiian moths whose caterpillars are amphibious. The caterpillars of this species prefer fast-flowing streams, and are frequently found deep in the central portions of those streams, although they can also be seen resting outside of the water.
