= Hyposmocoma petalifera =

Scientific classification
- Domain: Eukaryota
- Kingdom: Animalia
- Phylum: Arthropoda
- Class: Insecta
- Order: Lepidoptera
- Family: Cosmopterigidae
- Genus: Hyposmocoma
- Species: H. petalifera

Binomial name
- Hyposmocoma petalifera (Walsingham, 1907)

Synonyms
- Neelysia petalifera Walsingham, 1907

Species of moth

Hyposmocoma petalifera is a species of moth of the family Cosmopterigidae. It is endemic to the Hawaiian island of Maui. The type locality is Olinda, where it was collected at an elevation of 4,000 feet (1,200 m).
