= Hyposmocoma corticicolor =

Scientific classification
- Domain: Eukaryota
- Kingdom: Animalia
- Phylum: Arthropoda
- Class: Insecta
- Order: Lepidoptera
- Family: Cosmopterigidae
- Genus: Hyposmocoma
- Species: H. corticicolor

Binomial name
- Hyposmocoma corticicolor (Walsingham, 1907)

Synonyms
- Aphthonetus corticicolor Walsingham, 1907

Species of moth

Hyposmocoma corticicolor is a species of moth of the family Cosmopterigidae. It was first described by Lord Walsingham in 1907. It is endemic to the Hawaiian island of Maui. The type locality is Olinda, where it was collected at an altitude of 4,000 feet (1,200 m).
