= Hyposmocoma confusa =

Scientific classification
- Domain: Eukaryota
- Kingdom: Animalia
- Phylum: Arthropoda
- Class: Insecta
- Order: Lepidoptera
- Family: Cosmopterigidae
- Genus: Hyposmocoma
- Species: H. confusa

Binomial name
- Hyposmocoma confusa (Walsingham, 1907)

Synonyms
- Aphthonethus confusa Walsingham, 1907

Species of moth

Hyposmocoma confusa is a species of moth of the family Cosmopterigidae. It was first described by Lord Walsingham in 1907. It is endemic to the Hawaiian island of Maui. The type locality is Olinda, where it was collected at an altitude of 4,000 feet (1,200 m).
