= Hyposmocoma semiusta =

Scientific classification
- Domain: Eukaryota
- Kingdom: Animalia
- Phylum: Arthropoda
- Class: Insecta
- Order: Lepidoptera
- Family: Cosmopterigidae
- Genus: Hyposmocoma
- Species: H. semiusta

Binomial name
- Hyposmocoma semiusta (Walsingham, 1907)

Synonyms
- Hyperdasys semiustus Walsingham, 1907; Hyperdasyella semiusta

Species of moth

Hyposmocoma semiusta is a species of moth of the family Cosmopterigidae. It was first described by Lord Walsingham in 1907. It is endemic to the Hawaiian islands of Oahu and Kauai.

The larvae feed on the rotten wood of Acacia koa
