= Hyposmocoma jugifera =

Scientific classification
- Kingdom: Animalia
- Phylum: Arthropoda
- Class: Insecta
- Order: Lepidoptera
- Family: Cosmopterigidae
- Genus: Hyposmocoma
- Species: H. jugifera

Binomial name
- Hyposmocoma jugifera Meyrick, 1928

Species of moth

Hyposmocoma jugifera is a species of moth of the family Cosmopterigidae. It was first described by Edward Meyrick in 1928. It is endemic to the Hawaiian island of Oahu. The type locality is Mount Tantalus.

The larvae feed on Acacia koa and Melicope species. They bore in dead wood. They do not make a case.
