= Hyposmocoma argomacha =

Scientific classification
- Kingdom: Animalia
- Phylum: Arthropoda
- Class: Insecta
- Order: Lepidoptera
- Family: Cosmopterigidae
- Genus: Hyposmocoma
- Species: H. argomacha

Binomial name
- Hyposmocoma argomacha Meyrick, 1935

Species of moth

Hyposmocoma argomacha is a species of moth of the family Cosmopterigidae. It was first described by Edward Meyrick in 1935. It is endemic to the island of Hawaii. The type locality is Kīlauea.

The larvae feed on Smilax species. The larvae are elongate and whitish. They bore the dead stems of their host plant. They do not make cases.
