= Hyposmocoma philocharis =

Scientific classification
- Kingdom: Animalia
- Phylum: Arthropoda
- Class: Insecta
- Order: Lepidoptera
- Family: Cosmopterigidae
- Genus: Hyposmocoma
- Species: H. philocharis

Binomial name
- Hyposmocoma philocharis (Meyrick, 1915)

Synonyms
- Hyperdasys philocharis Meyrick, 1915; Hyperdasyella philocharis

Species of moth

Hyposmocoma philocharis is a species of moth of the family Cosmopterigidae. It was first described by Edward Meyrick in 1915. It is endemic to the Hawaiian island of Oahu. The type locality, where it was first identified, is the Koʻolau Range, near Honolulu.
