= Hyposmocoma neckerensis =

Scientific classification
- Domain: Eukaryota
- Kingdom: Animalia
- Phylum: Arthropoda
- Class: Insecta
- Order: Lepidoptera
- Family: Cosmopterigidae
- Genus: Hyposmocoma
- Species: H. neckerensis

Binomial name
- Hyposmocoma neckerensis (Swezey, 1926)

Synonyms
- Petrochroa neckerensis Swezey, 1926

Species of moth

Hyposmocoma neckerensis is a species of moth of the family Cosmopterigidae. It was first described by Otto Swezey in 1926. It is endemic to Necker Island and Gardner Island in the western Pacific.
