= Hyposmocoma poeciloceras =

Scientific classification
- Domain: Eukaryota
- Kingdom: Animalia
- Phylum: Arthropoda
- Class: Insecta
- Order: Lepidoptera
- Family: Cosmopterigidae
- Genus: Hyposmocoma
- Species: H. poeciloceras

Binomial name
- Hyposmocoma poeciloceras (Walsingham, 1907)

Synonyms
- Neelysia poeciloceras Walsingham, 1907

Species of moth

Hyposmocoma poeciloceras is a species of moth of the family Cosmopterigidae. It is endemic to the Hawaiian island of Maui. The type locality is Haleakalā, where it was collected at an elevation of 4,000 feet (1,200 m).
