= Hyposmocoma basivittata =

Scientific classification
- Domain: Eukaryota
- Kingdom: Animalia
- Phylum: Arthropoda
- Class: Insecta
- Order: Lepidoptera
- Family: Cosmopterigidae
- Genus: Hyposmocoma
- Species: H. basivittata

Binomial name
- Hyposmocoma basivittata (Walsingham, 1907)

Synonyms
- Neelysia basivittata Walsingham, 1907

Species of moth

Hyposmocoma basivittata is a species of moth of the family Cosmopterigidae. It is endemic to the Hawaiian island of Maui. The type locality is Haleakalā, where it was collected at an elevation of 5,000 feet (1,500 m).
