= Hyposmocoma papaiili =

Scientific classification
- Kingdom: Animalia
- Phylum: Arthropoda
- Clade: Pancrustacea
- Class: Insecta
- Order: Lepidoptera
- Family: Cosmopterigidae
- Genus: Hyposmocoma
- Species: H. papaiili

Binomial name
- Hyposmocoma papaiili P. Schmitz & Rubinoff, 2011

Species of moth

Hyposmocoma papaiili is a species of moth of the family Cosmopterigidae. It is endemic to Maui.

The wingspan is 7.2–8.8 mm for males and 12.6 mm for females.

The larvae have been reared on lichen and fish food.
