= Hyposmocoma trifasciata =

Scientific classification
- Domain: Eukaryota
- Kingdom: Animalia
- Phylum: Arthropoda
- Class: Insecta
- Order: Lepidoptera
- Family: Cosmopterigidae
- Genus: Hyposmocoma
- Species: H. trifasciata

Binomial name
- Hyposmocoma trifasciata (Swezey, 1915)

Synonyms
- Petrochroa trifasciata Swezey, 1915

Species of moth

Hyposmocoma trifasciata is a species of moth of the family Cosmopterigidae. It was first described by Otto Swezey in 1915. It is endemic to the island of Hawaii. The type locality is Laupāhoehoe.
