= Hyposmocoma pupumoehewa =

Scientific classification
- Kingdom: Animalia
- Phylum: Arthropoda
- Clade: Pancrustacea
- Class: Insecta
- Order: Lepidoptera
- Family: Cosmopterigidae
- Genus: Hyposmocoma
- Species: H. pupumoehewa

Binomial name
- Hyposmocoma pupumoehewa P. Schmitz & Rubinoff, 2011

Species of moth

Hyposmocoma pupumoehewa is a species of moth of the family Cosmopterigidae. It is endemic to Maui.

The wingspan is 11–12.2 mm for males and 11.4–13.8 mm for females.

The larvae have been observed feeding on snails of the genus Tornatellides. They use silk to bind snails to nearby leaves and force their way into the snail's shell to feed. The larvae live in a larval case which has the form of an elongated structure with one entrance at each end. It is decorated with bits of sand and pebbles heavily woven with silk filaments. In the wild, lichen and empty snail shells are also used.

== Etymology ==
The specific name is derived from the Hawaiian, pūpū (meaning snail) and moehewa (meaning nightmare) and refers to the unique feeding habits of the caterpillars.
