= Hyposmocoma sideroxyloni =

Scientific classification
- Domain: Eukaryota
- Kingdom: Animalia
- Phylum: Arthropoda
- Class: Insecta
- Order: Lepidoptera
- Family: Cosmopterigidae
- Genus: Hyposmocoma
- Species: H. sideroxyloni

Binomial name
- Hyposmocoma sideroxyloni (Swezey, 1932)

Synonyms
- Aphthonetus sideroxyloni Swezey, 1932

Species of moth

Hyposmocoma sideroxyloni is a species of moth of the family Cosmopterigidae. It was first described by Otto Herman Swezey in 1932. It is endemic to the Hawaiian island of Oahu.
