= Hyposmocoma chloraula =

Scientific classification
- Kingdom: Animalia
- Phylum: Arthropoda
- Class: Insecta
- Order: Lepidoptera
- Family: Cosmopterigidae
- Genus: Hyposmocoma
- Species: H. chloraula

Binomial name
- Hyposmocoma chloraula Meyrick, 1928

Species of moth

Hyposmocoma chloraula is a species of moth of the family Cosmopterigidae. It was first described by Edward Meyrick in 1928. It is endemic to the Hawaiian island of Kauai. The type locality is Summit Camp.

The larvae feed on Astelia species. They bore in dead stems of their host.
