= Hyposmocoma eliai =

Scientific classification
- Kingdom: Animalia
- Phylum: Arthropoda
- Clade: Pancrustacea
- Class: Insecta
- Order: Lepidoptera
- Family: Cosmopterigidae
- Genus: Hyposmocoma
- Species: H. eliai

Binomial name
- Hyposmocoma eliai P. Schmitz & Rubinoff, 2011

Species of moth

Hyposmocoma eliai is a species of moth of the family Cosmopterigidae. It is endemic to Kauai. Larvae were collected on large barren volcanic rocks placed along the shoreline to reduce erosion in Nawiliwili bay.

The wingspan is 4.5–5.2 mm for males and 4.6–5.7 mm for females.
