= Hyposmocoma oxypetra =

Scientific classification
- Kingdom: Animalia
- Phylum: Arthropoda
- Class: Insecta
- Order: Lepidoptera
- Family: Cosmopterigidae
- Genus: Hyposmocoma
- Species: H. oxypetra

Binomial name
- Hyposmocoma oxypetra Meyrick, 1935

Species of moth

Hyposmocoma oxypetra is a species of moth of the family Cosmopterigidae. It was first described by Edward Meyrick in 1935. It is endemic to the Hawaiian island of Oahu. The type locality are the Pacific Heights in Honolulu.
