= Hyposmocoma nohomaalewa =

Scientific classification
- Kingdom: Animalia
- Phylum: Arthropoda
- Clade: Pancrustacea
- Class: Insecta
- Order: Lepidoptera
- Family: Cosmopterigidae
- Genus: Hyposmocoma
- Species: H. nohomaalewa

Binomial name
- Hyposmocoma nohomaalewa P. Schmitz & Rubinoff, 2011

Species of moth

Hyposmocoma nohomaalewa is a species of moth of the family Cosmopterigidae. It is endemic to Kauai.

The wingspan is 5.6–6.6 mm for males and 4.6–5.7 mm for females.
