= Hyposmocoma humerella =

Scientific classification
- Domain: Eukaryota
- Kingdom: Animalia
- Phylum: Arthropoda
- Class: Insecta
- Order: Lepidoptera
- Family: Cosmopterigidae
- Genus: Hyposmocoma
- Species: H. humerella

Binomial name
- Hyposmocoma humerella (Walsingham, 1907)

Synonyms
- Aphthonetus humerella Walsingham, 1907

Species of moth

Hyposmocoma humerella is a species of moth of the family Cosmopterigidae. It was first described by Lord Walsingham in 1907. It is endemic to the Hawaiian island of Maui. The type locality is Haleakalā, where it was collected at an altitude of 5,000 feet (1,500 m).
