= Hyposmocoma laysanensis =

Scientific classification
- Kingdom: Animalia
- Phylum: Arthropoda
- Clade: Pancrustacea
- Class: Insecta
- Order: Lepidoptera
- Family: Cosmopterigidae
- Genus: Hyposmocoma
- Species: H. laysanensis

Binomial name
- Hyposmocoma laysanensis Schmitz and Rubinoff, 2009

Species of moth

Hyposmocoma laysanensis is a species of moth of the family Cosmopterigidae. It is endemic to Laysan. The type locality is Guano Rock.

The wingspan is 5.2–7.7 mm.
