= Hyposmocoma ekemamao =

Scientific classification
- Kingdom: Animalia
- Phylum: Arthropoda
- Clade: Pancrustacea
- Class: Insecta
- Order: Lepidoptera
- Family: Cosmopterigidae
- Genus: Hyposmocoma
- Species: H. ekemamao

Binomial name
- Hyposmocoma ekemamao Schmitz and Rubinoff, 2009

Species of moth

Hyposmocoma laysanensis is a species of moth of the family Cosmopterigidae. It is endemic to Laysan. The type locality is Guano Rock.

The wingspan is 10–10.5 mm.

The larval case is purse-shaped and is 4.1–7.0 mm in length.
