= Hyposmocoma coprosmae =

Scientific classification
- Domain: Eukaryota
- Kingdom: Animalia
- Phylum: Arthropoda
- Class: Insecta
- Order: Lepidoptera
- Family: Cosmopterigidae
- Genus: Hyposmocoma
- Species: H. coprosmae

Binomial name
- Hyposmocoma coprosmae (Swezey, 1920)

Synonyms
- Semnoprepia coprosmae Swezey, 1920

Species of moth

Hyposmocoma coprosmae is a species of moth of the family Cosmopterigidae. It was first described by Otto Swezey in 1920. It is endemic to the Hawaiian island of Oahu. The type locality is Malamalama, Mount Konahuanui.

The larvae feed on Coprosma longijolia.
