= Hyposmocoma longisquamella =

Scientific classification
- Domain: Eukaryota
- Kingdom: Animalia
- Phylum: Arthropoda
- Class: Insecta
- Order: Lepidoptera
- Family: Cosmopterigidae
- Genus: Hyposmocoma
- Species: H. longisquamella

Binomial name
- Hyposmocoma longisquamella (Walsingham, 1907)

Synonyms
- Elachista longisquamella Walsingham, 1907; Petrochroa nigrella Swezey, 1940

Species of moth

Hyposmocoma longisquamella is a species of moth of the family Cosmopterigidae. It was first described by Lord Walsingham in 1907. It is endemic to the island of Hawaii. The type locality is Kona, where it was collected at an elevation of 4,000 feet (1,200 m).
