= Hyposmocoma trivitella =

Scientific classification
- Domain: Eukaryota
- Kingdom: Animalia
- Phylum: Arthropoda
- Class: Insecta
- Order: Lepidoptera
- Family: Cosmopterigidae
- Genus: Hyposmocoma
- Species: H. trivitella

Binomial name
- Hyposmocoma trivitella (Swezey, 1913)

Synonyms
- Euhyposmocoma trivitella Swezey, 1913

Species of moth

Hyposmocoma trivitella is a species of moth of the family Cosmopterigidae. It was first described by Otto Swezey in 1913. It is endemic to the Hawaiian island of Kauai. The type locality is Haleakalā.

== Original description of larva and pupa ==
Full-grown larva 8 mm; dirty whitish yellow; head very pale brownish, much retracted into segment prothorax; eyes dark brown; cervical shield concolorous; tubercles concolorous. Pupa 7 mm., light yellowish-brown; eyes black; wing-sheaths and antennae-sheaths extend to apex of seventh abdominal segment; a cluster of bristles at apex of abdomen hooked into silk cocoon. The pupa is formed within the mine in a slight cocoon covered with pellets of frass.

— Otto Swezey, 1913
