= Hyposmocoma cristata =

Scientific classification
- Domain: Eukaryota
- Kingdom: Animalia
- Phylum: Arthropoda
- Class: Insecta
- Order: Lepidoptera
- Family: Cosmopterigidae
- Genus: Hyposmocoma
- Species: H. cristata

Binomial name
- Hyposmocoma cristata (Butler, 1881)

Synonyms
- Euperissus cristatus Butler, 1881

Species of moth

Hyposmocoma cristata is a species of moth of the family Cosmopterigidae. It was first described by Arthur Gardiner Butler in 1881. It is endemic to the Hawaiian islands of Oahu, Molokai and Hawaii. The type locality is the mountains near Honolulu.

This species is often abundant.
