= Hyposmocoma kikokolu =

Scientific classification
- Kingdom: Animalia
- Phylum: Arthropoda
- Clade: Pancrustacea
- Class: Insecta
- Order: Lepidoptera
- Family: Cosmopterigidae
- Genus: Hyposmocoma
- Species: H. kikokolu

Binomial name
- Hyposmocoma kikokolu Schmitz and Rubinoff, 2009

Species of moth

Hyposmocoma kikokolu is a species of moth of the family Cosmopterigidae. It is endemic to Nīhoa. The type locality is Miller Canyon.

The wingspan is 8–10 millimetres (mm).
