= Hyposmocoma alveata =

Scientific classification
- Kingdom: Animalia
- Phylum: Arthropoda
- Class: Insecta
- Order: Lepidoptera
- Family: Cosmopterigidae
- Genus: Hyposmocoma
- Species: H. alveata

Binomial name
- Hyposmocoma alveata (Meyrick, 1915)

Synonyms
- Neelysia alveata Meyrick, 1915

Species of moth

Hyposmocoma alveata is a species of moth of the family Cosmopterigidae. It was first described by Edward Meyrick in 1915. It is endemic to the Hawaiian island of Oahu. The type locality is the Koʻolau Range.
