= Hyposmocoma mediocris =

Scientific classification
- Domain: Eukaryota
- Kingdom: Animalia
- Phylum: Arthropoda
- Class: Insecta
- Order: Lepidoptera
- Family: Cosmopterigidae
- Genus: Hyposmocoma
- Species: H. mediocris

Binomial name
- Hyposmocoma mediocris (Walsingham, 1907)

Synonyms
- Aphthonetus mediocris Walsingham, 1907

Species of moth

Hyposmocoma mediocris is a species of moth of the family Cosmopterigidae. It was first described by Lord Walsingham in 1907. It is endemic to the Hawaiian island of Maui. The type locality is Haleakalā, where it was collected on an altitude of 5,000 feet (1,500 m).
