= Hyposmocoma menehune =

Scientific classification
- Kingdom: Animalia
- Phylum: Arthropoda
- Clade: Pancrustacea
- Class: Insecta
- Order: Lepidoptera
- Family: Cosmopterigidae
- Genus: Hyposmocoma
- Species: H. menehune

Binomial name
- Hyposmocoma menehune Schmitz and Rubinoff, 2009

Species of moth

Hyposmocoma menehune is a species of moth of the family Cosmopterigidae. It is endemic to Nīhoa. The type locality is Miller Canyon.

The wingspan is 7.2–7.4 mm.
