= Hyposmocoma empedota =

Scientific classification
- Domain: Eukaryota
- Kingdom: Animalia
- Phylum: Arthropoda
- Class: Insecta
- Order: Lepidoptera
- Family: Cosmopterigidae
- Genus: Hyposmocoma
- Species: H. empedota

Binomial name
- Hyposmocoma empedota Meyrick, 1915

Species of moth

Hyposmocoma empedota is a species of moth of the family Cosmopterigidae. It was first described by Edward Meyrick in 1915. It is endemic to the Hawaiian island of Oahu. The type locality is the Koʻolau Range behind Honolulu.

The larvae probably feed on lichen on the bark of Acacia koa, Manihot glaziovii, Prosopis and other trees.
