= Hyposmocoma wahikanake =

Scientific classification
- Kingdom: Animalia
- Phylum: Arthropoda
- Clade: Pancrustacea
- Class: Insecta
- Order: Lepidoptera
- Family: Cosmopterigidae
- Genus: Hyposmocoma
- Species: H. wahikanake

Binomial name
- Hyposmocoma wahikanake P. Schmitz & Rubinoff, 2011

Species of moth

Hyposmocoma wahikanake is a species of moth of the family Cosmopterigidae. It is endemic to Lanai.

The wingspan is 7.7 mm for males and 6.2–7.1 mm for females.
