= Hyposmocoma cryptogamiella =

Scientific classification
- Domain: Eukaryota
- Kingdom: Animalia
- Phylum: Arthropoda
- Class: Insecta
- Order: Lepidoptera
- Family: Cosmopterigidae
- Genus: Hyposmocoma
- Species: H. cryptogamiella

Binomial name
- Hyposmocoma cryptogamiella (Walsingham, 1907)

Synonyms
- Hyperdasys cryptogamiellus Walsingham, 1907; Hyperdasyella cryptogamiella

Species of moth

Hyposmocoma cryptogamiella is a species of moth of the family Cosmopterigidae. It was first described by Lord Walsingham in 1907. It is endemic to the Hawaiian islands of Kauai, Oahu, Molokai, Lanai and Hawaii. The type locality is Olaa Forest.

The larvae feed on Acacia koa, Clermontia, Lantana, Metrosideros and Sophora species. The larvae are naked stem-borers.
