= Hyposmocoma tigrina =

Scientific classification
- Domain: Eukaryota
- Kingdom: Animalia
- Phylum: Arthropoda
- Class: Insecta
- Order: Lepidoptera
- Family: Cosmopterigidae
- Genus: Hyposmocoma
- Species: H. tigrina

Binomial name
- Hyposmocoma tigrina (Butler, 1881)

Synonyms
- Chrysoclista tigrina Butler, 1881; Neelysia tigrina

Species of moth

Hyposmocoma tigrina is a species of moth of the family Cosmopterigidae. It was first described by Arthur Gardiner Butler in 1881. It is endemic to the Hawaiian island of Maui. The type locality is Haleakalā.

It was discovered on koa trees.
