= Hyposmocoma pittospori =

Scientific classification
- Domain: Eukaryota
- Kingdom: Animalia
- Phylum: Arthropoda
- Class: Insecta
- Order: Lepidoptera
- Family: Cosmopterigidae
- Genus: Hyposmocoma
- Species: H. pittospori

Binomial name
- Hyposmocoma pittospori (Swezey, 1920)

Synonyms
- Semnoprepia pittospori Swezey, 1920; Diplosara pittospori

Species of moth

Hyposmocoma pittospori is a species of moth of the family Cosmopterigidae. It was first described by Otto Swezey in 1920. It is endemic to the Hawaiian island of Oahu. The type locality is Kuliouou.
