= Hyposmocoma anisoplecta =

Scientific classification
- Domain: Eukaryota
- Kingdom: Animalia
- Phylum: Arthropoda
- Class: Insecta
- Order: Lepidoptera
- Family: Cosmopterigidae
- Genus: Hyposmocoma
- Species: H. anisoplecta

Binomial name
- Hyposmocoma anisoplecta Meyrick, 1935

Species of moth

Hyposmocoma anisoplecta is a species of moth of the family Cosmopterigidae. It was first described by Edward Meyrick in 1935.

== Distribution ==
It is endemic to the Hawaiian island of Oahu. The type locality is Mount Kaʻala.
