= Hyposmocoma centronoma =

Scientific classification
- Kingdom: Animalia
- Phylum: Arthropoda
- Class: Insecta
- Order: Lepidoptera
- Family: Cosmopterigidae
- Genus: Hyposmocoma
- Species: H. centronoma

Binomial name
- Hyposmocoma centronoma Meyrick, 1935

Species of moth

Hyposmocoma centronoma is a species of moth of the family Cosmopterigidae. It was first described by Edward Meyrick in 1935. It is endemic to the Hawaiian island of Oahu. The type locality is Kawaihapai.

The larvae feed on Metrosideros species.
