= Hyposmocoma pukoa =

Scientific classification
- Kingdom: Animalia
- Phylum: Arthropoda
- Clade: Pancrustacea
- Class: Insecta
- Order: Lepidoptera
- Family: Cosmopterigidae
- Genus: Hyposmocoma
- Species: H. pukoa

Binomial name
- Hyposmocoma pukoa P. Schmitz & Rubinoff, 2011

Species of moth

Hyposmocoma pukoa is a species of moth of the family Cosmopterigidae. It is endemic to Maui.

The wingspan is 9–10.7 mm for males and 10.1–10.8 mm for females.
