= Hyposmocoma tischeriella =

Scientific classification
- Domain: Eukaryota
- Kingdom: Animalia
- Phylum: Arthropoda
- Class: Insecta
- Order: Lepidoptera
- Family: Cosmopterigidae
- Genus: Hyposmocoma
- Species: H. tischeriella

Binomial name
- Hyposmocoma tischeriella (Walsingham, 1907)

Synonyms
- Neelysia tischeriella Walsingham, 1907

Species of moth

Hyposmocoma tischeriella is a species of moth of the family Cosmopterigidae. It was first described by Lord Walsingham in 1907. It is endemic to the Hawaiian island of Kauai. The type locality is Kaholuamano, where it was collected at an elevation of 4,000 feet (1,200 m).
