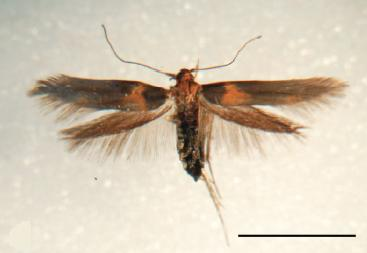

Scientific classification
- Kingdom: Animalia
- Phylum: Arthropoda
- Clade: Pancrustacea
- Class: Insecta
- Order: Lepidoptera
- Family: Cosmopterigidae
- Genus: Hyposmocoma
- Species: H. makawao

Binomial name
- Hyposmocoma makawao Kawahara & Rubinoff, 2012

= Hyposmocoma makawao =

Species of moth

Hyposmocoma makawao is a species of moth of the family Cosmopterigidae. It is known only from the Makawao Forest Reserve on Maui.

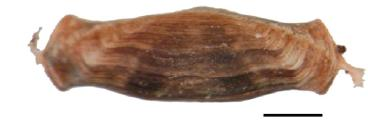
Larval case

The length of the forewings is 4.8 millimetres (0.19 in) for males and 4.9 millimetres (0.19 in) for females. Adults differ from any other species in the genus Hyposmocoma, since no other species has a single, thick, transverse orange band near the base of the forewing.

The larval case is 4.1–5.0 millimetres (0.16–0.20 in) in length and 1.2–1.6 millimetres (0.047–0.063 in) wide, smooth with banding that follows the length of the case. Two wide, dark bands form a V-shape that crosses over the central region of the case.

== Etymology ==
The species is named makawao after its type locality, Makawao Forest Reserve, Maui.
