= Hyposmocoma subocellata =

Scientific classification
- Domain: Eukaryota
- Kingdom: Animalia
- Phylum: Arthropoda
- Class: Insecta
- Order: Lepidoptera
- Family: Cosmopterigidae
- Genus: Hyposmocoma
- Species: H. subocellata

Binomial name
- Hyposmocoma subocellata (Walsingham, 1907)

Synonyms
- Aphthonetus subocellata Walsingham, 1907

Species of moth

Hyposmocoma subocellata is a species of moth of the family Cosmopterigidae. It was first described by Lord Walsingham in 1907. It is endemic to the Hawaiian island of Maui. The type locality is Haleakalā, where it was collected at an elevation between 4,000 and 5,000 feet (1,200 and 1,500 m).
