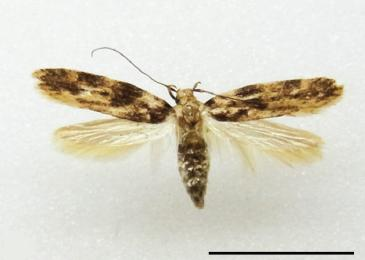

Scientific classification
- Kingdom: Animalia
- Phylum: Arthropoda
- Clade: Pancrustacea
- Class: Insecta
- Order: Lepidoptera
- Family: Cosmopterigidae
- Genus: Hyposmocoma
- Species: H. tantala

Binomial name
- Hyposmocoma tantala Kawahara & Rubinoff, 2012

= Hyposmocoma tantala =

Species of moth

Hyposmocoma tantala is a species of moth of the family Cosmopterigidae. It is known only from Mount Tantalus on Oahu.

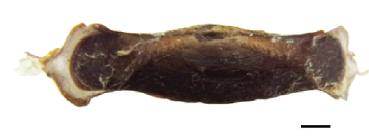
Larval case

The length of the forewings is 5.5 millimetres (0.22 in) for males and 6.2 millimetres (0.24 in) for females.

The larval case is dark brown, smooth, 9 millimetres (0.35 in) in length and 2 millimetres (0.079 in) wide. Adults were reared from case-making larvae collected on bark of a damp dead tree covered partially with lichen.

== Etymology ==
The species is named tantala after Mount Tantalus, from where the type specimen was collected.
