= Hyposmocoma alticola =

Scientific classification
- Kingdom: Animalia
- Phylum: Arthropoda
- Class: Insecta
- Order: Lepidoptera
- Family: Cosmopterigidae
- Genus: Hyposmocoma
- Species: H. alticola

Binomial name
- Hyposmocoma alticola (Meyrick, 1915)

Species of moth

Hyposmocoma alticola is a species of moth of the family Cosmopterigidae. It was first described by Edward Meyrick in 1915. It is endemic to the Hawaiian island of Oahu. The type locality is the Koʻolau Range, near Honolulu.
