= Hyposmocoma digressa =

Scientific classification
- Domain: Eukaryota
- Kingdom: Animalia
- Phylum: Arthropoda
- Class: Insecta
- Order: Lepidoptera
- Family: Cosmopterigidae
- Genus: Hyposmocoma
- Species: H. digressa

Binomial name
- Hyposmocoma digressa (Walsingham, 1907)

Synonyms
- Neelysia digressa Walsingham, 1907

Species of moth

Hyposmocoma digressa is a species of moth of the family Cosmopterigidae. It was first described by Lord Walsingham in 1907. It is endemic to the Hawaiian island of Maui. The type locality is Haleakalā, where it was collected at an elevation of 5,000 feet (1,500 m).
