= Hyposmocoma opuulaau =

Scientific classification
- Kingdom: Animalia
- Phylum: Arthropoda
- Clade: Pancrustacea
- Class: Insecta
- Order: Lepidoptera
- Family: Cosmopterigidae
- Genus: Hyposmocoma
- Species: H. opuulaau

Binomial name
- Hyposmocoma opuulaau P. Schmitz & Rubinoff, 2011

Species of moth

Hyposmocoma opuulaau is a species of moth of the family Cosmopterigidae. It is endemic to Maui.

The wingspan is 6.9–8.5 mm for males and 8.6–8.9 mm for females.
