= Hyposmocoma swezeyi =

Scientific classification
- Domain: Eukaryota
- Kingdom: Animalia
- Phylum: Arthropoda
- Class: Insecta
- Order: Lepidoptera
- Family: Cosmopterigidae
- Genus: Hyposmocoma
- Species: H. swezeyi

Binomial name
- Hyposmocoma swezeyi (Busck, 1914)

Synonyms
- Petrochroa swezeyi Busck, 1914

Species of moth

Hyposmocoma swezeyi is a species of moth of the family Cosmopterigidae. It was first described by August Busck in 1914. It is endemic to the Hawaiian island of Oahu. The type locality is Kaimuki, Honolulu.

The larvae probably feed on lichens. The larvae make small, oval, flattened cases covered with particles of soil. They have been found on rocks.
