= Hyposmocoma hygroscopa =

Scientific classification
- Kingdom: Animalia
- Phylum: Arthropoda
- Class: Insecta
- Order: Lepidoptera
- Family: Cosmopterigidae
- Genus: Hyposmocoma
- Species: H. hygroscopa

Binomial name
- Hyposmocoma hygroscopa Meyrick, 1935

Species of moth

Hyposmocoma hygroscopa is a species of moth of the family Cosmopterigidae. It was first described by Edward Meyrick in 1935. It is endemic to Kauai.
