= Hyposmocoma argyresthiella =

Scientific classification
- Domain: Eukaryota
- Kingdom: Animalia
- Phylum: Arthropoda
- Class: Insecta
- Order: Lepidoptera
- Family: Cosmopterigidae
- Genus: Hyposmocoma
- Species: H. argyresthiella

Binomial name
- Hyposmocoma argyresthiella (Walsingham, 1907)

Synonyms
- Neelysia argyresthiella Walsingham, 1907

Species of moth

Hyposmocoma argyresthiella is a species of moth of the family Cosmopterigidae. It was first described by Lord Walsingham in 1907. It is endemic to the Hawaiian islands of Kauai, Oahu, Molokai and Hawaii. The type locality is Kaawaloa, Kona, where it was collected at an elevation above 2,000 feet (610 m).

The larvae have been reared from silken tunnels in moss.
