= Hyposmocoma hemicasis =

Scientific classification
- Domain: Eukaryota
- Kingdom: Animalia
- Phylum: Arthropoda
- Class: Insecta
- Order: Lepidoptera
- Family: Cosmopterigidae
- Genus: Hyposmocoma
- Species: H. hemicasis

Binomial name
- Hyposmocoma hemicasis Meyrick, 1935

Species of moth

Hyposmocoma hemicasis is a species of moth of the family Cosmopterigidae. It was first described by Edward Meyrick in 1935. It is endemic to the Hawaiian island of Oahu. The type locality is Mount Kaʻala.
