= Hyposmocoma communis =

Scientific classification
- Domain: Eukaryota
- Kingdom: Animalia
- Phylum: Arthropoda
- Class: Insecta
- Order: Lepidoptera
- Family: Cosmopterigidae
- Genus: Hyposmocoma
- Species: H. communis

Binomial name
- Hyposmocoma communis (Swezey, 1946)

Synonyms
- Petrochroa communis Swezey, 1946

Species of moth

Hyposmocoma communis is a species of moth of the family Cosmopterigidae. It was first described by Otto Swezey in 1946. It is endemic to the Hawaiian islands of Kauai and Oahu and is notable for their amphibious caterpillar stage, which allows them to survive underwater for long periods of time. They are typically small, with a wingspan reaching less than 1 centimetre (0.39 in).
