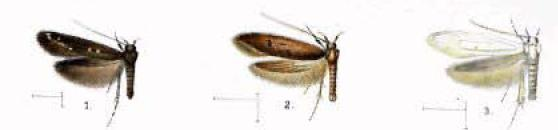
- Illustrations in Fauna Hawaiiensis: 1. Hyposmocoma terminella, 2. Hyposmocoma semicolon, 3. Hyposmocoma subeburneum

Scientific classification
- Domain: Eukaryota
- Kingdom: Animalia
- Phylum: Arthropoda
- Class: Insecta
- Order: Lepidoptera
- Family: Cosmopterigidae
- Genus: Hyposmocoma
- Species: H. subeburneum

Binomial name
- Hyposmocoma subeburneum (Walsingham, 1907)

Synonyms
- Bubaloceras subeburneum Walsingham, 1907

= Hyposmocoma subeburneum =

Species of moth

Hyposmocoma subeburneum is a species of moth of the family Cosmopterigidae. It was first described by Lord Walsingham in 1907. It is endemic to the Hawaiian island of Molokai.
