= Hyposmocoma palmivora =

Scientific classification
- Kingdom: Animalia
- Phylum: Arthropoda
- Class: Insecta
- Order: Lepidoptera
- Family: Cosmopterigidae
- Genus: Hyposmocoma
- Species: H. palmivora

Binomial name
- Hyposmocoma palmivora Meyrick, 1928

Species of moth

Hyposmocoma palmivora is a species of moth of the family Cosmopterigidae. It was first described by Edward Meyrick in 1928. It is endemic to the Hawaiian island of Kauai. The type locality is Kumuwela, where it was collected at an elevation of 4,000 feet (1,200 m).

The larvae feed on Pritchardia eriophora. The naked larvae were found feeding amongst the abundant yellowish cottony tomentum on undersides of leaves.
