= Hyposmocoma nephelodes =

Scientific classification
- Domain: Eukaryota
- Kingdom: Animalia
- Phylum: Arthropoda
- Class: Insecta
- Order: Lepidoptera
- Family: Cosmopterigidae
- Genus: Hyposmocoma
- Species: H. nephelodes

Binomial name
- Hyposmocoma nephelodes Walsingham, 1908

Synonyms
- Hyposmocoma nebulifera Walsingham, 1907

Species of moth

Hyposmocoma nephelodes is a species of moth of the family Cosmopterigidae. It was first described by Lord Walsingham in 1907. It is endemic to the Hawaiian island of Oahu and possibly Maui. The type locality is the Waianae Range.
