= Hyposmocoma petroptilota =

Scientific classification
- Domain: Eukaryota
- Kingdom: Animalia
- Phylum: Arthropoda
- Class: Insecta
- Order: Lepidoptera
- Family: Cosmopterigidae
- Genus: Hyposmocoma
- Species: H. petroptilota

Binomial name
- Hyposmocoma petroptilota (Walsingham, 1907)

Synonyms
- Semnoprepia petroptilota Walsingham, 1907

Species of moth

Hyposmocoma petroptilota is a species of moth of the family Cosmopterigidae. It was first described by Lord Walsingham in 1907. It is endemic to the Hawaiian islands of Kauai, Oahu, Maui and Hawaii. The type locality is Kīlauea.

The larvae feed on dead wood of Metrosideros and Pelea species.
