= Hyposmocoma suffusella =

Scientific classification
- Domain: Eukaryota
- Kingdom: Animalia
- Phylum: Arthropoda
- Class: Insecta
- Order: Lepidoptera
- Family: Cosmopterigidae
- Genus: Hyposmocoma
- Species: H. suffusella

Binomial name
- Hyposmocoma suffusella (Walsingham, 1907)

Synonyms
- Hyposmocoma lupella var. suffusella Walsingham, 1907

Species of moth

Hyposmocoma suffusella is a species of moth of the family Cosmopterigidae. It was first described by Lord Walsingham in 1907. It is endemic to the Hawaiian islands of Molokai and Maui.

The larvae feed on Pipturus. The larva is known to be a case-maker.
