= Hyposmocoma albocinerea =

Scientific classification
- Domain: Eukaryota
- Kingdom: Animalia
- Phylum: Arthropoda
- Class: Insecta
- Order: Lepidoptera
- Family: Cosmopterigidae
- Genus: Hyposmocoma
- Species: H. albocinerea

Binomial name
- Hyposmocoma albocinerea (Walsingham, 1907)

Synonyms
- Aphthonetus albocinerea Walsingham, 1907

Species of moth

Hyposmocoma albocinerea is a species of moth of the family Cosmopterigidae. It was first described by Lord Walsingham in 1907. It is endemic to the Hawaiian island of Kauai.
