= Hyposmocoma latiflua =

Scientific classification
- Kingdom: Animalia
- Phylum: Arthropoda
- Class: Insecta
- Order: Lepidoptera
- Family: Cosmopterigidae
- Genus: Hyposmocoma
- Species: H. latiflua

Binomial name
- Hyposmocoma latiflua Meyrick, 1915

Species of moth

Hyposmocoma latiflua is a species of moth of the family Cosmopterigidae. It was first described by Edward Meyrick in 1915. It is endemic to the Hawaiian island of Oahu. The type locality is the Koʻolau Range, above Honolulu.

The larvae feed on Pittosporum cauliflorum.
