= Hyposmocoma nemoricola =

Scientific classification
- Domain: Eukaryota
- Kingdom: Animalia
- Phylum: Arthropoda
- Class: Insecta
- Order: Lepidoptera
- Family: Cosmopterigidae
- Genus: Hyposmocoma
- Species: H. nemoricola

Binomial name
- Hyposmocoma nemoricola (Walsingham, 1907)

Synonyms
- Neelysia nemoricola Walsingham, 1907

Species of moth

Hyposmocoma nemoricola is a species of moth of the family Cosmopterigidae. It was first described by Lord Walsingham in 1907. It is endemic to the Hawaiian island of Molokai. The type locality is the forest above Pelekunu.
