= Hyposmocoma incongrua =

Scientific classification
- Domain: Eukaryota
- Kingdom: Animalia
- Phylum: Arthropoda
- Class: Insecta
- Order: Lepidoptera
- Family: Cosmopterigidae
- Genus: Hyposmocoma
- Species: H. incongrua

Binomial name
- Hyposmocoma incongrua (Walsingham, 1907)

Synonyms
- Neelysia incongrua Walsingham, 1907

Species of moth

Hyposmocoma incongrua is a species of moth of the family Cosmopterigidae. It is endemic to the Hawaiian island of Maui. It was first described by Lord Walsingham in 1907. The type locality is Haleakala, where it was collected at an altitude between 5,000 and 6,000 feet (1,500 and 1,800 m).
