= Hyposmocoma bitincta =

Scientific classification
- Domain: Eukaryota
- Kingdom: Animalia
- Phylum: Arthropoda
- Class: Insecta
- Order: Lepidoptera
- Family: Cosmopterigidae
- Genus: Hyposmocoma
- Species: H. bitincta

Binomial name
- Hyposmocoma bitincta (Walsingham, 1907)

Synonyms
- Aphthonetus bitincta Walsingham, 1907

Species of moth

Hyposmocoma bitincta is a species of moth of the family Cosmopterigidae. It was first described by Lord Walsingham in 1907. It is endemic to the Hawaiian island of Maui and is possibly also present on Kauai and Oahu.

Larvae have been found in dead bark of Acacia koa.
