= Hyposmocoma mormopica =

Scientific classification
- Kingdom: Animalia
- Phylum: Arthropoda
- Class: Insecta
- Order: Lepidoptera
- Family: Cosmopterigidae
- Genus: Hyposmocoma
- Species: H. mormopica

Binomial name
- Hyposmocoma mormopica (Meyrick, 1935)

Synonyms
- Neelysia mormopica Meyrick, 1935

Species of moth

Hyposmocoma mormopica is a species of moth of the family Cosmopterigidae. It was first described by Edward Meyrick in 1935. It is endemic to the Hawaiian island of Oahu. The type locality is Punaluu.
