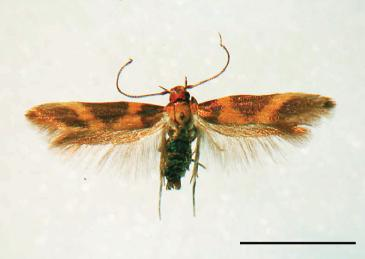

Scientific classification
- Kingdom: Animalia
- Phylum: Arthropoda
- Clade: Pancrustacea
- Class: Insecta
- Order: Lepidoptera
- Family: Cosmopterigidae
- Subfamily: Cosmopteriginae
- Genus: Hyposmocoma; Butler, 1881

Synonyms
- Euperissus Butler, 1881; Diplosara Meyrick, 1883; Agonismus Walsingham, 1907; Aphthonetus Walsingham, 1907; Bubaloceras Walsingham, 1907; Dysphoria Walsingham, 1907; Hyperdasys Walsingham, 1907; Neelysia Walsingham, 1907; Rhinomactrum Walsingham, 1907; Semnoprepia Walsingham, 1907; Euhyposmocoma Swezey, 1913; Petrochroa Busck, 1914; Phthoraula Meyrick, 1935; Hyperdasysella T. B. Fletcher, 1940; Hyposmochoma Auctt. (misspelling)

= Hyposmocoma =

Genus of moths

Hyposmocoma is a genus of moths with over 350 species endemic to the Hawaiian Islands whose larvae are referred to by the common name of Hawaiian fancy case caterpillars. The genus was first described by Arthur Gardiner Butler in 1881. Most species of Hyposmocoma have plant-based diets, but four species, such as Hyposmocoma molluscivora, eat snails. The caterpillars spin silk, which they then use to capture and eat snails. These are the first caterpillars known to eat snails (or mollusks of any kind). One unnamed species in the genus, dubbed the "bone collector", lives in association with spiders, forming a case from the shed body parts from the spider and remnants of the spider's prey items, providing camouflage while it feeds on discarded prey in the spider's web.

Some species feature amphibious caterpillars. This trait has evolved at least three times within this genus.

== Species ==
- Subgenus Euperissus Butler, 1881
  - Hyposmocoma adelphella Walsingham, 1907
  - Hyposmocoma adolescens Walsingham, 1907
  - Hyposmocoma agnetella (Walsingham, 1907)
  - Hyposmocoma albocinerea (Walsingham, 1907)
  - Hyposmocoma alticola Meyrick, 1915
  - Hyposmocoma anthinella (Walsingham, 1907)
  - Hyposmocoma argentea Walsingham, 1907
  - Hyposmocoma argomacha Meyrick, 1935
  - Hyposmocoma argyresthiella (Walsingham, 1907)
  - Hyposmocoma arundinicolor (Walsingham, 1907)
  - Hyposmocoma aspersa (Butler, 1882)
  - Hyposmocoma auroargentea Walsingham, 1907
  - Hyposmocoma barbata Walsingham, 1907
  - Hyposmocoma basivittata (Walsingham, 1907)
  - Hyposmocoma bitincta (Walsingham, 1907)
  - Hyposmocoma brevistrigata Walsingham, 1907
  - Hyposmocoma caecinervis Meyrick, 1928
  - Hyposmocoma catapyrrha (Meyrick, 1935)
  - Hyposmocoma centralis Walsingham, 1907
  - Hyposmocoma centronoma Meyrick, 1935
  - Hyposmocoma chilonella Walsingham, 1907
  - Hyposmocoma chloraula Meyrick, 1928
  - Hyposmocoma cleodorella (Walsingham, 1907)
  - Hyposmocoma columbella (Walsingham, 1907)
  - Hyposmocoma complanella (Walsingham, 1907)
  - Hyposmocoma confusa (Walsingham, 1907)
  - Hyposmocoma coprosmae (Swezey, 1920)
  - Hyposmocoma corticicolor (Walsingham, 1907)
  - Hyposmocoma cristata (Butler, 1881)
  - Hyposmocoma cryptogamiella (Walsingham, 1907)
  - Hyposmocoma cuprea (Walsingham, 1907)
  - Hyposmocoma diffusa (Walsingham, 1907)
  - Hyposmocoma digressa (Walsingham, 1907)
  - Hyposmocoma discolor Walsingham, 1907
  - Hyposmocoma divergens (Walsingham, 1907)
  - Hyposmocoma dorsella Walsingham, 1907
  - Hyposmocoma ekaha Swezey, 1910
  - Hyposmocoma elegans (Walsingham, 1907)
  - Hyposmocoma eleuthera (Walsingham, 1907)
  - Hyposmocoma emendata Walsingham, 1907
  - Hyposmocoma empetra (Meyrick, 1915)
  - Hyposmocoma enixa Walsingham, 1907
  - Hyposmocoma ensifer Walsingham, 1907
  - Hyposmocoma epicharis Walsingham, 1907
  - Hyposmocoma erebogramma (Meyrick, 1935)
  - Hyposmocoma erismatias Meyrick, 1928
  - Hyposmocoma exaltata (Walsingham, 1907)
  - Hyposmocoma exornata Walsingham, 1907
  - Hyposmocoma exsul (Walsingham, 1907)
  - Hyposmocoma falsimella Walsingham, 1907
  - Hyposmocoma ferruginea (Swezey, 1915)
  - Hyposmocoma flavicosta (Walsingham, 1907)
  - Hyposmocoma fluctuosa (Walsingham, 1907)
  - Hyposmocoma fractivittella Walsingham, 1907
  - Hyposmocoma fugitiva (Walsingham, 1907)
  - Hyposmocoma fulvida Walsingham, 1907
  - Hyposmocoma fulvocervina Walsingham, 1907
  - Hyposmocoma fulvogrisea (Walsingham, 1907)
  - Hyposmocoma fuscodentata (Walsingham, 1907)
  - Hyposmocoma fuscofusa (Walsingham, 1907)
  - Hyposmocoma fuscopurpurata Zimmerman,
  - Hyposmocoma hirsuta (Walsingham, 1907)
  - Hyposmocoma homopyrrha (Meyrick, 1935)
  - Hyposmocoma humerella (Walsingham, 1907)
  - Hyposmocoma incongrua (Walsingham, 1907)
  - Hyposmocoma inflexa Walsingham, 1907
  - Hyposmocoma insinuatrix Meyrick, 1928
  - Hyposmocoma jugifera Meyrick, 1928
  - Hyposmocoma kauaiensis (Walsingham, 1907)
  - Hyposmocoma latiflua Meyrick, 1915
  - Hyposmocoma lichenalis (Walsingham, 1907)
  - Hyposmocoma lignicolor (Walsingham, 1907)
  - Hyposmocoma limata Walsingham, 1907
  - Hyposmocoma longitudinalis Walsingham, 1907
  - Hyposmocoma lugens Walsingham, 1907
  - Hyposmocoma lunifer Walsingham, 1907
  - Hyposmocoma mactella (Walsingham, 1907)
  - Hyposmocoma maestella Walsingham, 1907
  - Hyposmocoma malacopa Meyrick, 1915
  - Hyposmocoma margella (Walsingham, 1907)
  - Hyposmocoma mediocris (Walsingham, 1907)
  - Hyposmocoma mormopica (Meyrick, 1935)
  - Hyposmocoma municeps (Walsingham, 1907)
  - Hyposmocoma mystodoxa Meyrick, 1915
  - Hyposmocoma nemo (Walsingham, 1907)
  - Hyposmocoma nemoricola (Walsingham, 1907)
  - Hyposmocoma nigrodentata Walsingham, 1907
  - Hyposmocoma ningorella (Walsingham, 1907)
  - Hyposmocoma ningorifera (Walsingham, 1907)
  - Hyposmocoma nipholoncha Meyrick, 1935
  - Hyposmocoma niveiceps Walsingham, 1907
  - Hyposmocoma obliterata Walsingham, 1907
  - Hyposmocoma obscura Walsingham, 1907
  - Hyposmocoma ocellata Walsingham, 1907
  - Hyposmocoma ochreovittella Walsingham, 1907
  - Hyposmocoma oculifera Walsingham, 1907
  - Hyposmocoma ossea Walsingham, 1907
  - Hyposmocoma pallidipalpis Walsingham, 1907
  - Hyposmocoma palmifera (Meyrick, 1935)
  - Hyposmocoma palmivora Meyrick, 1928
  - Hyposmocoma paltodorella (Walsingham, 1907)
  - Hyposmocoma passerella (Walsingham, 1907)
  - Hyposmocoma petalifera (Walsingham, 1907)
  - Hyposmocoma petroptilota (Walsingham, 1907)
  - Hyposmocoma phantasmatella Walsingham, 1907
  - Hyposmocoma philocharis (Meyrick, 1915)
  - Hyposmocoma pittospori (Swezey, 1920)
  - Hyposmocoma plumbifer (Walsingham, 1907)
  - Hyposmocoma pluviella (Walsingham, 1907)
  - Hyposmocoma poeciloceras (Walsingham, 1907)
  - Hyposmocoma polia (Walsingham, 1907)
  - Hyposmocoma praefracta (Meyrick, 1935)
  - Hyposmocoma pritchardiae (Swezey, 1933)
  - Hyposmocoma psaroderma (Walsingham, 1907)
  - Hyposmocoma pucciniella Walsingham, 1907
  - Hyposmocoma puncticiliata (Walsingham, 1907)
  - Hyposmocoma punctifumella Walsingham, 1907
  - Hyposmocoma quadripunctata Walsingham, 1907
  - Hyposmocoma quadristriata Walsingham, 1907
  - Hyposmocoma radiatella Walsingham, 1907
  - Hyposmocoma rediviva (Walsingham, 1907)
  - Hyposmocoma repandella (Walsingham, 1907)
  - Hyposmocoma roseofulva Walsingham, 1907
  - Hyposmocoma rotifer (Walsingham, 1907)
  - Hyposmocoma rusius Walsingham, 1907
  - Hyposmocoma rutilellum (Walsingham, 1907)
  - Hyposmocoma sagittata (Walsingham, 1907)
  - Hyposmocoma scandens Walsingham, 1907
  - Hyposmocoma scepticella (Walsingham, 1907)
  - Hyposmocoma sciurella (Walsingham, 1907)
  - Hyposmocoma semifuscata Walsingham, 1907
  - Hyposmocoma semiusta (Walsingham, 1907)
  - Hyposmocoma sideroxyloni (Swezey, 1932)
  - Hyposmocoma sordidella (Walsingham, 1907)
  - Hyposmocoma spurcata (Walsingham, 1907)
  - Hyposmocoma stigmatella Walsingham, 1907
  - Hyposmocoma subargentea Walsingham, 1907
  - Hyposmocoma subaurata (Walsingham, 1907)
  - Hyposmocoma subeburneum (Walsingham, 1907)
  - Hyposmocoma sublimata Walsingham, 1907
  - Hyposmocoma subnitida Walsingham, 1907
  - Hyposmocoma subocellata (Walsingham, 1907)
  - Hyposmocoma subsericea Walsingham, 1907
  - Hyposmocoma sudorella Walsingham, 1907
  - Hyposmocoma terminella (Walsingham, 1907)
  - Hyposmocoma thermoxyla Meyrick, 1915
  - Hyposmocoma tigrina (Butler, 1881)
  - Hyposmocoma tischeriella (Walsingham, 1907)
  - Hyposmocoma trichophora (Walsingham, 1907)
  - Hyposmocoma tricincta Walsingham, 1907
  - Hyposmocoma trilunella Walsingham, 1907
  - Hyposmocoma trivitella (Swezey, 1913)
  - Hyposmocoma unicolor (Walsingham, 1907)
  - Hyposmocoma veterella (Walsingham, 1907)
  - Hyposmocoma vicina Walsingham, 1907
- Subgenus Hyposmocoma
  - Hyposmocoma abjecta (Butler, 1881)
  - Hyposmocoma adjacens (Walsingham, 1907)
  - Hyposmocoma admirationis Walsingham, 1907
  - Hyposmocoma advena Walsingham, 1907
  - Hyposmocoma albifrontella Walsingham, 1907
  - Hyposmocoma albonivea Walsingham, 1907
  - Hyposmocoma alliterata Walsingham, 1907
  - Hyposmocoma alveata (Meyrick, 1915)
  - Hyposmocoma anisoplecta Meyrick, 1935
  - Hyposmocoma arenella Walsingham, 1907
  - Hyposmocoma argentiferus (Walsingham, 1907)
  - Hyposmocoma atrovittella Walsingham, 1907
  - Hyposmocoma auripennis (Butler, 1881)
  - Hyposmocoma auropurpurea Walsingham, 1907
  - Hyposmocoma bacillella Walsingham, 1907
  - Hyposmocoma bella Walsingham, 1907
  - Hyposmocoma belophora Walsingham, 1907
  - Hyposmocoma bilineata Walsingham, 1907
  - Hyposmocoma blackburnii (Butler, 1881)
  - Hyposmocoma butalidella Walsingham, 1907
  - Hyposmocoma calva Walsingham, 1907
  - Hyposmocoma candidella (Walsingham, 1907)
  - Hyposmocoma canella Walsingham, 1907
  - Hyposmocoma carbonentata Walsingham, 1907
  - Hyposmocoma carnea Walsingham, 1907
  - Hyposmocoma cincta Walsingham, 1907
  - Hyposmocoma cinereosparsa Walsingham, 1907
  - Hyposmocoma commensella Walsingham, 1907
  - Hyposmocoma communis (Swezey, 1946)
  - Hyposmocoma conditella Walsingham, 1907
  - Hyposmocoma continuella Walsingham, 1907
  - Hyposmocoma coruscans (Walsingham, 1907)
  - Hyposmocoma corvina (Butler, 1881)
  - Hyposmocoma costimaculata Walsingham, 1907
  - Hyposmocoma crossotis Meyrick, 1915
  - Hyposmocoma cupreomaculata Walsingham, 1907
  - Hyposmocoma discella Walsingham, 1907
  - Hyposmocoma divisa Walsingham, 1907
  - Hyposmocoma domicolens (Butler, 1881)
  - Hyposmocoma elegantula (Swezey, 1934)
  - Hyposmocoma empedota Meyrick, 1915
  - Hyposmocoma endryas Meyrick, 1915
  - Hyposmocoma evanescens Walsingham, 1907
  - Hyposmocoma fallacella Walsingham, 1907
  - Hyposmocoma ferricolor Walsingham, 1907
  - Hyposmocoma fervida Walsingham, 1907
  - Hyposmocoma filicivora Meyrick, 1935
  - Hyposmocoma flavipalpis (Walsingham, 1907)
  - Hyposmocoma fractinubella Wahingham, 1907
  - Hyposmocoma fractistriata Walsingham, 1907
  - Hyposmocoma fuscopurpurea Walsingham, 1907
  - Hyposmocoma fuscotogata Walsingham, 1907
  - Hyposmocoma geminella Walsingham, 1907
  - Hyposmocoma genitalis Walsingham, 1907
  - Hyposmocoma haleakalae (Butler, 1881)
  - Hyposmocoma hemicasis Meyrick, 1935
  - Hyposmocoma humerovittella Walsingham, 1907
  - Hyposmocoma hygroscopa Meyrick, 1935
  - Hyposmocoma illuminata Walsingham, 1907
  - Hyposmocoma impunctata Walsingham, 1907
  - Hyposmocoma indicella Walsingham, 1907
  - Hyposmocoma intermixta Walsingham, 1907
  - Hyposmocoma inversella Walsingham, 1907
  - Hyposmocoma iodes Walsingham, 1907
  - Hyposmocoma irregularis Walsingham, 1907
  - Hyposmocoma lacertella Walsingham, 1907
  - Hyposmocoma lactea Walsingham, 1907
  - Hyposmocoma lacticretella Walsingham, 1907
  - Hyposmocoma lebetella Walsingham, 1907
  - Hyposmocoma leporella Walsingham, 1907
  - Hyposmocoma lignivora (Butler, 1879)
  - Hyposmocoma lineata Walsingham, 1907
  - Hyposmocoma liturata Walsingham, 1907
  - Hyposmocoma lixiviella Walsingham, 1907
  - Hyposmocoma longisquamella (Walsingham, 1907)
  - Hyposmocoma lucifer Walsingham, 1907
  - Hyposmocoma ludificata Walsingham, 1907
  - Hyposmocoma lupella Walsingham, 1907
  - Hyposmocoma malornata Walsingham, 1907
  - Hyposmocoma marginenotata Walsingham, 1907
  - Hyposmocoma mediella Walsingham, 1907
  - Hyposmocoma mediospurcata Walsingham, 1907
  - Hyposmocoma mesorectis Meyrick, 1915
  - Hyposmocoma metallica Walsingham, 1907
  - Hyposmocoma metrosiderella Walsingham, 1907
  - Hyposmocoma mimema Walsingham, 1907
  - Hyposmocoma mimica Walsingham, 1907
  - Hyposmocoma modesta Walsingham, 1907
  - Hyposmocoma montivolans (Butler, 1882)
  - Hyposmocoma nebulifera Walsingham, 1907
  - Hyposmocoma neckerensis (Swezey, 1926)
  - Hyposmocoma nephelodes Walsingham, 1908
  - Hyposmocoma niger Walsingham, 1907
  - Hyposmocoma nigralbida Walsingham, 1907
  - Hyposmocoma nigrescens Walsingham, 1907
  - Hyposmocoma nividorsella Walsingham, 1907
  - Hyposmocoma notabilis Walsingham, 1907
  - Hyposmocoma numida Walsingham, 1907
  - Hyposmocoma ochreocervina Walsingham, 1907
  - Hyposmocoma ochreociliata Walsingham, 1907
  - Hyposmocoma oxypetra Meyrick, 1935
  - Hyposmocoma paradoxa Walsingham, 1907
  - Hyposmocoma parda (Butler, 1881)
  - Hyposmocoma partita Walsingham, 1907
  - Hyposmocoma patriciella Walsingham, 1907
  - Hyposmocoma persimilis Walsingham, 1907
  - Hyposmocoma petroscia Meyrick, 1915
  - Hyposmocoma phalacra Walsingham, 1907
  - Hyposmocoma pharsotoma Meyrick, 1915
  - Hyposmocoma picticornis Walsingham, 1907
  - Hyposmocoma progressa Walsingham, 1907
  - Hyposmocoma prophantis Meyrick, 1915
  - Hyposmocoma propinqua Walsingham, 1907
  - Hyposmocoma pseudolita Walsingham, 1907
  - Hyposmocoma punctiplicata Walsingham, 1907
  - Hyposmocoma quinquemaculata Walsingham, 1907
  - Hyposmocoma rhabdophora Walsingham, 1907
  - Hyposmocoma rubescens Walsingham, 1907
  - Hyposmocoma sabulella Walsingham, 1907
  - Hyposmocoma saccophora Walsingham, 1907
  - Hyposmocoma saliaris Walsingham, 1907
  - Hyposmocoma scapulellum (Walsingham, 1907)
  - Hyposmocoma schismatica Walsingham, 1907
  - Hyposmocoma scolopax Walsingham, 1907
  - Hyposmocoma semicolon (Walsingham, 1907)
  - Hyposmocoma semifusa (Walsingham, 1907)
  - Hyposmocoma sideritis Walsingham, 1907
  - Hyposmocoma similis Walsingham, 1907
  - Hyposmocoma somatodes Walsingham, 1907
  - Hyposmocoma straminella Walsingham, 1907
  - Hyposmocoma subcitrella Walsingham, 1907
  - Hyposmocoma subflavidella Wralsingham, 1907
  - Hyposmocoma subscolopax Walsingham, 1907
  - Hyposmocoma suffusa (Walsingham, 1907)
  - Hyposmocoma suffusella (Walsingham, 1907)
  - Hyposmocoma swezeyi (Busck, 1914)
  - Hyposmocoma syrrhaptes Walsingham, 1907
  - Hyposmocoma tarsimaculata Walsingham, 1907
  - Hyposmocoma tenuipalpis Walsingham, 1907
  - Hyposmocoma tetraonella Walsingham, 1907
  - Hyposmocoma thiatma Meyrick, 1935
  - Hyposmocoma thoracella Walsingham, 1907
  - Hyposmocoma tomentosa Walsingham, 1907
  - Hyposmocoma torella Walsingham, 1907
  - Hyposmocoma torquata Walsingham, 1907
  - Hyposmocoma trifasciata (Swezey, 1915)
  - Hyposmocoma trimaculata Walsingham, 1907
  - Hyposmocoma trimelanota Meyrick, 1935
  - Hyposmocoma tripartita Walsingham, 1907
  - Hyposmocoma triptila Meyrick, 1915
  - Hyposmocoma trossulella Walsingham, 1907
  - Hyposmocoma turdella Walsingham, 1907
  - Hyposmocoma unistriata Walsingham, 1907
  - Hyposmocoma vermiculata Walsingham, 1907
  - Hyposmocoma vinicolor Walsingham, 1907
  - Hyposmocoma virgata Walsingham, 1907
- Unknown subgenus
  - Hyposmocoma anoai Medeiros, Haines & Rubinoff, 2017
  - Hyposmocoma aumakuawai P. Schmitz & Rubinoff, 2011
  - Hyposmocoma carnivora P. Schmitz & Rubinoff, 2011
  - Hyposmocoma eepawai P. Schmitz & Rubinoff, 2011
  - Hyposmocoma ekemamao Schmitz and Rubinoff, 2009
  - Hyposmocoma eliai P. Schmitz & Rubinoff, 2011
  - Hyposmocoma hooilo Medeiros, Haines & Rubinoff, 2017
  - Hyposmocoma ipohapuu Kawahara & Rubinoff, 2012
  - Hyposmocoma ipowainui P. Schmitz & Rubinoff, 2011
  - Hyposmocoma kahaiao P. Schmitz & Rubinoff, 2011
  - Hyposmocoma kahamanoa P. Schmitz & Rubinoff, 2011
  - Hyposmocoma kaikuono Schmitz & Rubinoff, 2008
  - Hyposmocoma kamakou P. Schmitz & Rubinoff, 2011
  - Hyposmocoma kamaula Medeiros, Haines & Rubinoff, 2017
  - Hyposmocoma kanaloa Medeiros, Haines & Rubinoff, 2017
  - Hyposmocoma kapakai Schmitz & Rubinoff, 2008
  - Hyposmocoma kaupo Schmitz & Rubinoff, 2008
  - Hyposmocoma kawaikoi P. Schmitz & Rubinoff, 2011
  - Hyposmocoma kikokolu Schmitz and Rubinoff, 2009
  - Hyposmocoma laysanensis Schmitz and Rubinoff, 2009
  - Hyposmocoma mahoepo Medeiros, Haines & Rubinoff, 2017
  - Hyposmocoma makawao Kawahara & Rubinoff, 2012
  - Hyposmocoma menehune Schmitz and Rubinoff, 2009
  - Hyposmocoma mokumana Schmitz and Rubinoff, 2009
  - Hyposmocoma molluscivora Haines & Rubinoff, 2006
  - Hyposmocoma moopalikea P. Schmitz & Rubinoff, 2011
  - Hyposmocoma nihoa Schmitz and Rubinoff, 2009
  - Hyposmocoma nohomaalewa P. Schmitz & Rubinoff, 2011
  - Hyposmocoma nohomeha Medeiros, Haines & Rubinoff, 2017
  - Hyposmocoma oolea Medeiros, Haines & Rubinoff, 2017
  - Hyposmocoma opuulaau P. Schmitz & Rubinoff, 2011
  - Hyposmocoma opuumaloo Schmitz and Rubinoff, 2009
  - Hyposmocoma pahanalo Medeiros, Haines & Rubinoff, 2017
  - Hyposmocoma papahanau Schmitz and Rubinoff, 2009
  - Hyposmocoma papaiili P. Schmitz & Rubinoff, 2011
  - Hyposmocoma pukoa P. Schmitz & Rubinoff, 2011
  - Hyposmocoma pupumoehewa P. Schmitz & Rubinoff, 2011
  - Hyposmocoma tantala Kawahara & Rubinoff, 2012
  - Hyposmocoma uhauiole P. Schmitz & Rubinoff, 2011
  - Hyposmocoma waauhi Medeiros, Haines & Rubinoff, 2017
  - Hyposmocoma wahikanake P. Schmitz & Rubinoff, 2011
  - Hyposmocoma waihohonu P. Schmitz & Rubinoff, 2011
  - Hyposmocoma waikamoi P. Schmitz & Rubinoff, 2011
  - Hyposmocoma wailua P. Schmitz & Rubinoff, 2011

There are a number of undescribed species.

== See also ==
- Amphibious caterpillar
