= Hyposmocoma veterella =

Scientific classification
- Domain: Eukaryota
- Kingdom: Animalia
- Phylum: Arthropoda
- Class: Insecta
- Order: Lepidoptera
- Family: Cosmopterigidae
- Genus: Hyposmocoma
- Species: H. veterella

Binomial name
- Hyposmocoma veterella (Walsingham, 1907)

Synonyms
- Aphthonetus veterella Walsingham, 1907

Species of moth

Hyposmocoma veterella is a species of moth of the family Cosmopterigidae. It was first described by Lord Walsingham in 1907. It is endemic to the Hawaiian island of Kauai. The type locality is Halemanu, where it was collected at an elevation of 4,000 feet (1,200 m).
