= Hyposmocoma homopyrrha =

Scientific classification
- Kingdom: Animalia
- Phylum: Arthropoda
- Class: Insecta
- Order: Lepidoptera
- Family: Cosmopterigidae
- Genus: Hyposmocoma
- Species: H. homopyrrha

Binomial name
- Hyposmocoma homopyrrha (Meyrick, 1935)

Synonyms
- Phthoraula homopyrrha Meyrick, 1935

Species of moth

Hyposmocoma homopyrrha is a species of moth of the family Cosmopterigidae. It was first described by Edward Meyrick in 1935. It is endemic to the Hawaiian island of Oahu. The type locality is Nuʻuanu Pali.

The larvae feed on Metrosideros species. The type specimen was bred from a larva found in dead wood.
