= Hyposmocoma opuumaloo =

Scientific classification
- Kingdom: Animalia
- Phylum: Arthropoda
- Clade: Pancrustacea
- Class: Insecta
- Order: Lepidoptera
- Family: Cosmopterigidae
- Genus: Hyposmocoma
- Species: H. opuumaloo

Binomial name
- Hyposmocoma opuumaloo Schmitz and Rubinoff, 2009

Species of moth

Hyposmocoma opuumaloo is a species of moth of the family Cosmopterigidae. It is endemic to Necker Island. The type locality is Flagpole Hill.

The wingspan is 8.9–9.1 mm.

The larval case is cone-shaped and 6.7–7.1 mm in length.

Adults were reared from case-making larvae. Larvae were collected on the ground.
