= Hyposmocoma waikamoi =

Scientific classification
- Kingdom: Animalia
- Phylum: Arthropoda
- Clade: Pancrustacea
- Class: Insecta
- Order: Lepidoptera
- Family: Cosmopterigidae
- Genus: Hyposmocoma
- Species: H. waikamoi

Binomial name
- Hyposmocoma waikamoi P. Schmitz & Rubinoff, 2011

Species of moth

Hyposmocoma waikamoi is a species of moth of the family Cosmopterigidae. It is endemic to Maui.

The wingspan is 10.4–11 mm for males and 9.8–9.9 mm for females.

== Etymology ==
The specific name is derived from the Nature Conservancy reserve on east Maui to which the species is apparently restricted.
