= Hyposmocoma fuscopurpurata =

Scientific classification
- Domain: Eukaryota
- Kingdom: Animalia
- Phylum: Arthropoda
- Class: Insecta
- Order: Lepidoptera
- Family: Cosmopterigidae
- Genus: Hyposmocoma
- Species: H. fuscopurpurata

Binomial name
- Hyposmocoma fuscopurpurata Zimmerman, 1978

Synonyms
- Semnoprepia fuscopurpurea Swezey, 1915

Species of moth

Hyposmocoma fuscopurpurata is a species of moth of the family Cosmopterigidae. It was first described by Elwood Zimmerman in 1978. It is endemic to the Hawaiian island of Oahu. The type locality is Mount Olympus.
