= Hyposmocoma carnivora =

Scientific classification
- Kingdom: Animalia
- Phylum: Arthropoda
- Clade: Pancrustacea
- Class: Insecta
- Order: Lepidoptera
- Family: Cosmopterigidae
- Genus: Hyposmocoma
- Species: H. carnivora

Binomial name
- Hyposmocoma carnivora P. Schmitz & Rubinoff, 2011

Species of moth

Hyposmocoma carnivora is a species of moth of the family Cosmopterigidae. It is endemic to Hawaii.

The wingspan is 10.2–12 mm (0.40–0.47 in) for males and about 11.1 mm (0.44 in) for females.

The larvae have been reared on snails of the genus Tornatellides and pupae of Drosophila melanogaster.
