= Hyposmocoma ekaha =

Scientific classification
- Domain: Eukaryota
- Kingdom: Animalia
- Phylum: Arthropoda
- Class: Insecta
- Order: Lepidoptera
- Family: Cosmopterigidae
- Genus: Hyposmocoma
- Species: H. ekaha

Binomial name
- Hyposmocoma ekaha Swezey, 1910

Synonyms
- Euhyposmocoma ekaha; Euhyposmocoma akaha Swezey, 1915 (misspelling); Euhyposmocoma asplenii T. B. Fletcher, 1929

Species of moth

Hyposmocoma ekaha is a species of moth of the family Cosmopterigidae. It was first described by Otto Herman Swezey in 1910. It is endemic to the Hawaiian island of Oahu. The type locality is the Halawa Valley.
