= Hyposmocoma ferruginea =

Scientific classification
- Domain: Eukaryota
- Kingdom: Animalia
- Phylum: Arthropoda
- Class: Insecta
- Order: Lepidoptera
- Family: Cosmopterigidae
- Genus: Hyposmocoma
- Species: H. ferruginea

Binomial name
- Hyposmocoma ferruginea (Swezey, 1915)

Synonyms
- Semnoprepia ferruginea Swezey, 1915

Species of moth

Hyposmocoma ferruginea is a species of moth of the family Cosmopterigidae. It was first described by Otto Swezey in 1915. It is endemic to the Hawaiian island of Oahu. The type locality is Mount Olympus.

The larvae feed on Cheirodendron species.

Swezey described the pupa as follows:

12 mm; pale reddish brown; antenna-sheaths, wing-sheaths and posterior leg-sheaths extend to near the apex of 5th abdominal segment; segments 4, 5 and 6 movable; cremaster blunt, with 6 or 8 hooked bristles.

— Otto Swezey, 1915:94
