= Hyposmocoma erebogramma =

Scientific classification
- Kingdom: Animalia
- Phylum: Arthropoda
- Class: Insecta
- Order: Lepidoptera
- Family: Cosmopterigidae
- Genus: Hyposmocoma
- Species: H. erebogramma

Binomial name
- Hyposmocoma erebogramma (Meyrick, 1935)

Synonyms
- Neelysia erebogramma Meyrick, 1935

Species of moth

Hyposmocoma erebogramma is a species of moth of the family Cosmopterigidae. It was first described by Edward Meyrick in 1935. It is endemic to the Hawaiian island of Oahu. The type locality is Kahuku.

The larvae feed on Hesperomannia species.
