= Hyposmocoma coruscans =

Scientific classification
- Domain: Eukaryota
- Kingdom: Animalia
- Phylum: Arthropoda
- Class: Insecta
- Order: Lepidoptera
- Family: Cosmopterigidae
- Genus: Hyposmocoma
- Species: H. coruscans

Binomial name
- Hyposmocoma coruscans (Walsingham, 1907)

Synonyms
- Agonismus coruscans Walsingham, 1907

Species of moth

Hyposmocoma coruscans is a species of moth of the family Cosmopterigidae. It was first described by Lord Walsingham in 1907. It is endemic to the island of Hawaii. The type locality is Kona, where it was collected at an elevation of 4,000 feet (1,200 m).
