= Hyposmocoma palmifera =

Scientific classification
- Kingdom: Animalia
- Phylum: Arthropoda
- Class: Insecta
- Order: Lepidoptera
- Family: Cosmopterigidae
- Genus: Hyposmocoma
- Species: H. palmifera

Binomial name
- Hyposmocoma palmifera (Meyrick, 1935)

Synonyms
- Neelysia palmifera Meyrick, 1935

Species of moth

Hyposmocoma palmifera is a species of moth of the family Cosmopterigidae. It was first described by Edward Meyrick in 1935. It is endemic to the Hawaiian islands of Oahu and possibly Hawaii. The type locality are the Pauoa Flats.

The larvae have been recorded on Acacia koa (in branches affected with rust galls), Pteralyxia (in dead twigs), Sophora tomentosa (in old pods), Wikstroemia (from dead wood).
