= Hyposmocoma nipholoncha =

Scientific classification
- Kingdom: Animalia
- Phylum: Arthropoda
- Class: Insecta
- Order: Lepidoptera
- Family: Cosmopterigidae
- Genus: Hyposmocoma
- Species: H. nipholoncha

Binomial name
- Hyposmocoma nipholoncha Meyrick, 1935

Species of moth

Hyposmocoma nipholoncha is a species of moth of the family Cosmopterigidae. It was first described by Edward Meyrick in 1935. It is endemic to the Hawaiian island of Oahu. The type locality is Mount Tantalus.

The larvae feed on Euphorbia species. The naked larvae are stem-borers.
