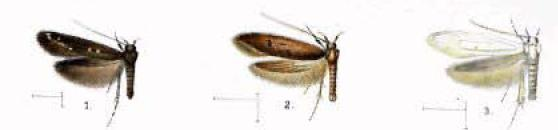
- Illustrations in Fauna Hawaiiensis: 1. Hyposmocoma terminella, 2. Hyposmocoma semicolon, 3. Hyposmocoma subeburneum

Scientific classification
- Kingdom: Animalia
- Phylum: Arthropoda
- Class: Insecta
- Order: Lepidoptera
- Family: Cosmopterigidae
- Genus: Hyposmocoma
- Species: H. semicolon

Binomial name
- Hyposmocoma semicolon (Walsingham, 1907)

Synonyms
- Dysphoria semicolon Walsingham, 1907

= Hyposmocoma semicolon =

Species of moth

Hyposmocoma semicolon is a moth species of the Cosmopterigidae family. It was first described by Lord Walsingham in 1907. It is endemic to the Hawaiian island of Kauai. The type locality is Kaholuamano, which was collected at an elevation of 4,000 feet (1,200 m).
