= Hyposmocoma kapakai =

Scientific classification
- Kingdom: Animalia
- Phylum: Arthropoda
- Clade: Pancrustacea
- Class: Insecta
- Order: Lepidoptera
- Family: Cosmopterigidae
- Genus: Hyposmocoma
- Species: H. kapakai

Binomial name
- Hyposmocoma kapakai Schmitz & Rubinoff, 2008

Species of moth

Hyposmocoma kapakai is a species of moth of the family Cosmopterigidae. It is endemic to Oahu. The type locality is the south-east coastal region.

The wingspan is 10.9–13.2 mm.
