= Hyposmocoma kauaiensis =

Scientific classification
- Domain: Eukaryota
- Kingdom: Animalia
- Phylum: Arthropoda
- Class: Insecta
- Order: Lepidoptera
- Family: Cosmopterigidae
- Genus: Hyposmocoma
- Species: H. kauaiensis

Binomial name
- Hyposmocoma kauaiensis (Walsingham, 1907)

Synonyms
- Aphthonetus kauaiensis Walsingham, 1907

Species of moth

Hyposmocoma kauaiensis is a species of moth of the family Cosmopterigidae. It was first described by Lord Walsingham in 1907. It is endemic to the Hawaiian island of Kauai. The type locality is Halemanu, where it was collected at an altitude of 4,000 feet (1,200 m).
