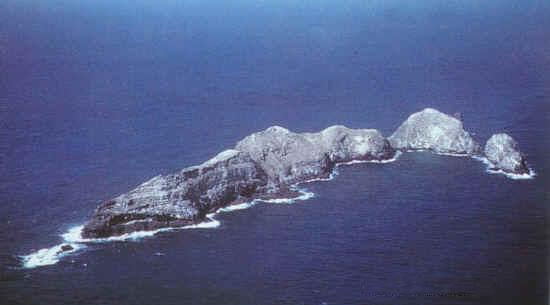
- Aerial view of Necker Island

Scientific classification
- Kingdom: Animalia
- Phylum: Arthropoda
- Clade: Pancrustacea
- Class: Insecta
- Order: Lepidoptera
- Family: Cosmopterigidae
- Genus: Hyposmocoma
- Species: H. mokumana

Binomial name
- Hyposmocoma mokumana Schmitz and Rubinoff, 2009

= Hyposmocoma mokumana =

Species of moth

Hyposmocoma mokumana is a species of moth of the family Cosmopterigidae. It is endemic to Necker Island. The type locality is Annexation Hill.

The wingspan is 11.4–14.3 mm.

The larval case is purse-shaped and 7.4–8.9 mm in length.

Adults were reared from case-making larvae. Cases were collected in Sesbania litter.
