= Hyposmocoma erismatias =

Scientific classification
- Kingdom: Animalia
- Phylum: Arthropoda
- Class: Insecta
- Order: Lepidoptera
- Family: Cosmopterigidae
- Genus: Hyposmocoma
- Species: H. erismatias

Binomial name
- Hyposmocoma erismatias Meyrick, 1928

Species of moth

Hyposmocoma erismatias is a species of moth of the family Cosmopterigidae. It was first described by Edward Meyrick in 1928. It is endemic to the Hawaiian island of Oahu. The type locality is Nuʻuanu Pali.

The larvae feed on Euphorbia species. The larvae are stem borers.
