= Hyposmocoma elegantula =

Scientific classification
- Domain: Eukaryota
- Kingdom: Animalia
- Phylum: Arthropoda
- Class: Insecta
- Order: Lepidoptera
- Family: Cosmopterigidae
- Genus: Hyposmocoma
- Species: H. elegantula

Binomial name
- Hyposmocoma elegantula (Swezey, 1934)

Synonyms
- Petrochroa elegantula Swezey, 1934

Species of moth

Hyposmocoma elegantula is a species of moth of the family Cosmopterigidae. It was first described by Otto Herman Swezey in 1934. It is endemic to the Hawaiian island of Oahu. The type locality is Koko Head.

Adults have been collected at flowers of Lipochaeta integrifolia, but the larvae and the host plant are unknown.
