= Hyposmocoma psaroderma =

Scientific classification
- Kingdom: Animalia
- Phylum: Arthropoda
- Class: Insecta
- Order: Lepidoptera
- Family: Cosmopterigidae
- Genus: Hyposmocoma
- Species: H. psaroderma

Binomial name
- Hyposmocoma psaroderma (Walsingham, 1907)

Synonyms
- Neelysia psaroderma Walsingham, 1907

Species of moth

Hyposmocoma psaroderma is a species of moth of the family Cosmopterigidae. It was first described by Lord Walsingham in 1907. It is endemic to the Hawaiian island of Oahu. The type locality is the Waianae Range, where the moth was collected at an elevation of 3,000 feet (910 m).
