= Hyposmocoma pritchardiae =

Scientific classification
- Domain: Eukaryota
- Kingdom: Animalia
- Phylum: Arthropoda
- Class: Insecta
- Order: Lepidoptera
- Family: Cosmopterigidae
- Genus: Hyposmocoma
- Species: H. pritchardiae

Binomial name
- Hyposmocoma pritchardiae (Swezey, 1933)

Synonyms
- Bubaloceras pritchardiae Swezey, 1933

Species of moth

Hyposmocoma pritchardiae is a species of moth of the family Cosmopterigidae. It was first described by Otto Swezey in 1933. It is endemic to the Hawaiian island of Kauai. The type locality is Kumuwela.

The larvae feed on Pritchardia eriophora.
