= Hyposmocoma cleodorella =

Scientific classification
- Domain: Eukaryota
- Kingdom: Animalia
- Phylum: Arthropoda
- Class: Insecta
- Order: Lepidoptera
- Family: Cosmopterigidae
- Genus: Hyposmocoma
- Species: H. cleodorella

Binomial name
- Hyposmocoma cleodorella (Walsingham, 1907)

Synonyms
- Neelysia cleodorella Walsingham, 1907

Species of moth

Hyposmocoma cleodorella is a species of moth of the family Cosmopterigidae. It was first described by Lord Walsingham in 1907. It is endemic to the island of Hawaii. The type locality is Kona, where it was collected at an elevation of 4,000 feet (1,200 m).
