= Hyposmocoma lignivora =

Scientific classification
- Domain: Eukaryota
- Kingdom: Animalia
- Phylum: Arthropoda
- Class: Insecta
- Order: Lepidoptera
- Family: Cosmopterigidae
- Genus: Hyposmocoma
- Species: H. lignivora

Binomial name
- Hyposmocoma lignivora (Butler, 1879)

Synonyms
- Diplosara lignivora; Scardia lignivora Butler, 1879

Species of moth

Hyposmocoma lignivora is a species of moth of the family Cosmopterigidae. It was first described by Arthur Gardiner Butler in 1879. It is endemic to the Hawaiian islands of Oahu and Molokai. This is a common and widely distributed moth on Oahu.

This was the first endemic species of Hawaiian microlepidoptera to be described.
