= Hyposmocoma kaupo =

Scientific classification
- Kingdom: Animalia
- Phylum: Arthropoda
- Clade: Pancrustacea
- Class: Insecta
- Order: Lepidoptera
- Family: Cosmopterigidae
- Genus: Hyposmocoma
- Species: H. kaupo

Binomial name
- Hyposmocoma kaupo Schmitz & Rubinoff, 2008

Species of moth

Hyposmocoma kaupo is a species of moth of the family Cosmopterigidae. It is endemic to Maui. The type locality is the Kaupo Gap area of east Maui, where it was collected at an altitude of 1,085 meters.

The wingspan is 12.2–13.3 mm.
