= Hyposmocoma flavipalpis =

Scientific classification
- Domain: Eukaryota
- Kingdom: Animalia
- Phylum: Arthropoda
- Class: Insecta
- Order: Lepidoptera
- Family: Cosmopterigidae
- Genus: Hyposmocoma
- Species: H. flavipalpis

Binomial name
- Hyposmocoma flavipalpis (Walsingham, 1907)

Synonyms
- Agonismus flavipalpis Walsingham, 1907

Species of moth

Hyposmocoma flavipalpis is a species of moth of the family Cosmopterigidae. It was first described by Lord Walsingham in 1907. It is endemic to the Hawaiian island of Maui. The type locality is Haleakalā, where it was collected at an elevation of 4,000 feet (1,200 m).
