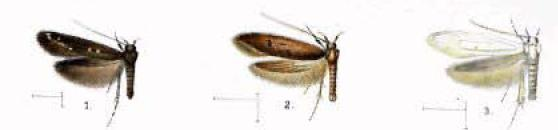
- Illustrations in Fauna Hawaiiensis: 1. Hyposmocoma terminella, 2. Hyposmocoma semicolon, 3. Hyposmocoma subeburneum

Scientific classification
- Domain: Eukaryota
- Kingdom: Animalia
- Phylum: Arthropoda
- Class: Insecta
- Order: Lepidoptera
- Family: Cosmopterigidae
- Genus: Hyposmocoma
- Species: H. terminella

Binomial name
- Hyposmocoma terminella (Walsingham, 1907)

Synonyms
- Neelysia terminella Walsingham, 1907

= Hyposmocoma terminella =

Species of moth

Hyposmocoma terminella is a moth species belonging to the family Cosmopterigidae. First described by Lord Walsingham in 1907, it is endemic to the Hawaiian island of Maui. The type locality is Haleakalā, where it was collected at an elevation of 5,000 feet (1,500 m).
