= Hyposmocoma kaikuono =

Scientific classification
- Kingdom: Animalia
- Phylum: Arthropoda
- Clade: Pancrustacea
- Class: Insecta
- Order: Lepidoptera
- Family: Cosmopterigidae
- Genus: Hyposmocoma
- Species: H. kaikuono

Binomial name
- Hyposmocoma kaikuono Schmitz & Rubinoff, 2008

Species of moth

Hyposmocoma kaikuono is a species of moth of the family Cosmopterigidae. It is endemic to Molokai. The type locality is Honouli, Malo’o Bay.

The wingspan is 10.1–13.2 mm.
