= Hyposmocoma aspersa =

Scientific classification
- Domain: Eukaryota
- Kingdom: Animalia
- Phylum: Arthropoda
- Class: Insecta
- Order: Lepidoptera
- Family: Cosmopterigidae
- Genus: Hyposmocoma
- Species: H. aspersa

Binomial name
- Hyposmocoma aspersa (Butler, 1882)

Synonyms
- Laverna aspersa Butler, 1882; Aphthonetus aspersa

Species of moth

Hyposmocoma aspersa is a species of moth of the family Cosmopterigidae. It was first described by Arthur Gardiner Butler in 1882. It is endemic to the Hawaiian island of Oahu. The type locality is the mountains near Honolulu.
