= Hyposmocoma nihoa =

Scientific classification
- Kingdom: Animalia
- Phylum: Arthropoda
- Clade: Pancrustacea
- Class: Insecta
- Order: Lepidoptera
- Family: Cosmopterigidae
- Genus: Hyposmocoma
- Species: H. nihoa

Binomial name
- Hyposmocoma nihoa Schmitz and Rubinoff, 2009

Species of moth

Hyposmocoma nihoa is a species of moth of the family Cosmopterigidae. It is endemic to Nīhoa, Northwestern Hawaiian Islands. The type locality is Miller Canyon.

The wingspan is 6.3–7.6 mm.

The larval case is burrito-shaped and 3.4–4.8 mm in length.

Adults were reared from case-making larvae. Larvae were collected on small bushes and rocks.
