= Hyposmocoma filicivora =

Scientific classification
- Kingdom: Animalia
- Phylum: Arthropoda
- Class: Insecta
- Order: Lepidoptera
- Family: Cosmopterigidae
- Genus: Hyposmocoma
- Species: H. filicivora

Binomial name
- Hyposmocoma filicivora Meyrick, 1935

Species of moth

Hyposmocoma filicivora is a species of moth of the family Cosmopterigidae. It was first described by Edward Meyrick in 1935. It is endemic to the Hawaiian island of Oahu. The type locality is Kōnāhuanui.

The larva constructs a flat case. It lives in the hollows of dead tree fern fronds.
