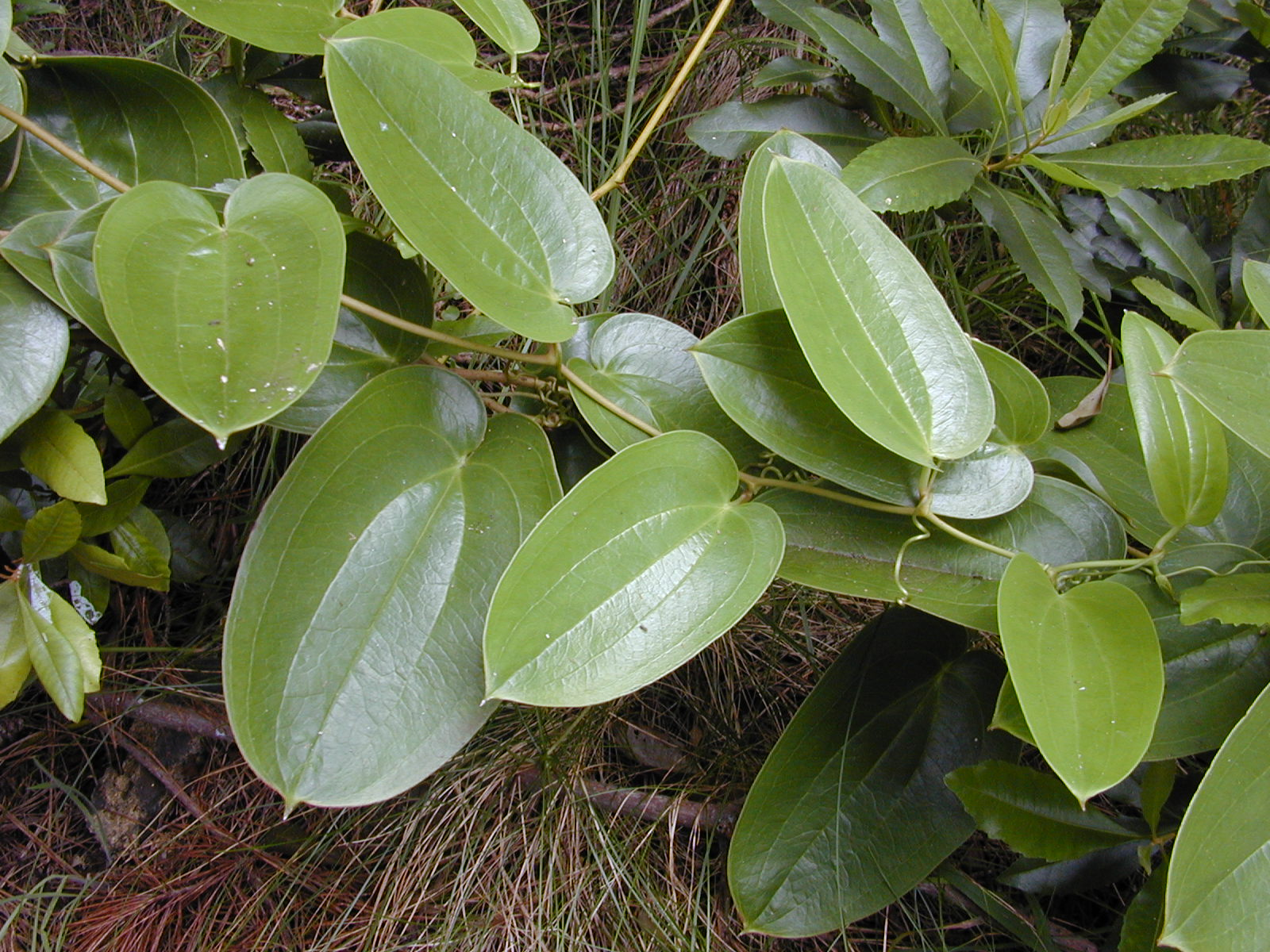

Scientific classification
- Kingdom: Plantae
- Clade: Tracheophytes
- Clade: Angiosperms
- Clade: Monocots
- Order: Liliales
- Family: Smilacaceae
- Genus: Smilax
- Species: S. melastomifolia

Binomial name
- Smilax melastomifolia Sm.

Synonyms
- Smilax sandwicensis Kunth; Pleiosmilax menziesii Seem.; Pleiosmilax sandwicensis (Kunth) Seem.; Smilax hawaiensis Seem.

= Smilax melastomifolia =

Species of plant

Smilax melastomifolia, the Hawai'i greenbrier, is a species of spiny vine found in nature only in the Hawaiian Islands. Spines occur not only on the stems but also on the underside of the leaves and on the peduncles of female flowers. Berries are white or pale green.
