= Olinda, Hawaii =

Unincorporated community in Hawaii, United States

- Census-designated place
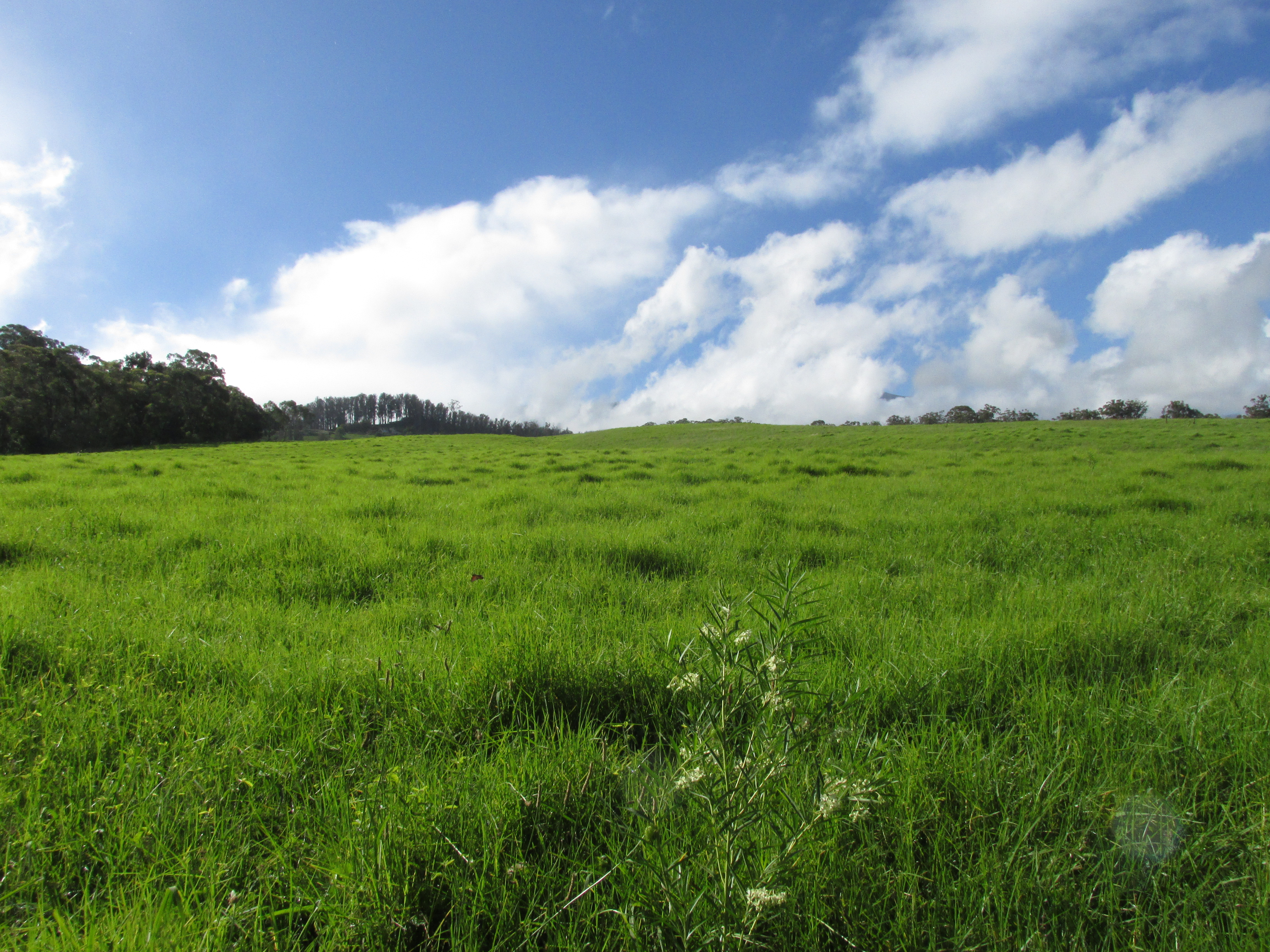
- Pasture in Olinda

- Location in Hawaii
- Country: United States
- State: Hawaii
- County: Maui

Area
  - Total: 7.50 sq mi (19.4 km^{2})
  - Land: 7.50 sq mi (19.4 km^{2})
  - Water: 0.0 sq mi (0 km^{2})
- Elevation: 2,700 ft (820 m)

Population (2020)
  - Total: 1,188
  - Density: 158.5/sq mi (61.2/km^{2})
- Time zone: UTC-10 (Hawaii-Aleutian)
- ZIP Code: 96768 (Makawao)
- Area code: 808
- FIPS code: 15-57350

Olinda is an agricultural and residential community on the island of Maui in the U.S. state of Hawaii, located approximately 2 miles (3 km) southeast of Makawao. It ranges in elevation from 1,800 to 4,200 feet (550 to 1,280 m) on the northern slopes of Haleakala. It is a census-designated place, with a population of 1,188 at the 2020 census and an area of 7.5 square miles (19 km^{2}).

Mark Twain once lived on Olinda Road.

The Rainbow Bridge concert by Jimi Hendrix was held in a cowfield just off Olinda Road.

== Demographics ==
=== 2020 census ===
As of the 2020 census, Olinda had a population of 1,188. The median age was 45.8 years. 19.5% of residents were under the age of 18 and 21.8% of residents were 65 years of age or older. For every 100 females there were 101.7 males, and for every 100 females age 18 and over there were 101.7 males age 18 and over.

0.0% of residents lived in urban areas, while 100.0% lived in rural areas.

There were 454 households in Olinda, of which 31.9% had children under the age of 18 living in them. Of all households, 44.9% were married-couple households, 17.4% were households with a male householder and no spouse or partner present, and 24.9% were households with a female householder and no spouse or partner present. About 22.0% of all households were made up of individuals and 10.5% had someone living alone who was 65 years of age or older.

There were 488 housing units, of which 7.0% were vacant. The homeowner vacancy rate was 0.0% and the rental vacancy rate was 4.6%.

Racial composition as of the 2020 census
Race	Number	Percent
White	789	66.4%
Black or African American	6	0.5%
American Indian and Alaska Native	11	0.9%
Asian	74	6.2%
Native Hawaiian and Other Pacific Islander	62	5.2%
Some other race	11	0.9%
Two or more races	235	19.8%
Hispanic or Latino (of any race)	75	6.3%
