= Amphibious caterpillar =

Various species of moth larvae

Amphibious caterpillar refers to over 40 species of semiaquatic caterpillars endemic to Hawaii that are the only insect larvae that live as readily in water as on land. In 2010, Daniel Rubinoff and Patrick Schmitz at the University of Hawaii at Manoa first described the amphibious habits of the larvae in the moth genus Hyposmocoma of the family Cosmopterigidae. Young of each species thrive both underwater in rushing streams and exposed to air on rocks poking out of the water. Rubinoff states, "These species are at least as different as chimpanzees are from us". While some other caterpillars can survive for short periods under water, they are possibly the only air-breather that can thrive exclusively there. "No other animal that breathes air can handle being submerged for a month", he says.

These caterpillars do not have gills or anything that covers the trachea to operate marine mammals' surface-to-breathe technique for respiration. Instead they appear to absorb oxygen directly through pores in their "skin" from the enveloping water. The caterpillars require flowing water to provide sufficient oxygen. They spin "silk" tethers to attach themselves to the downstream sides of rocks to keep from washing away.

They cover themselves with silk "cases" in a variety of shapes and sizes that they add to as they grow, with names such as cones, bugles, burritos, cigars, candy wrappers, oyster shells, dog bones and bow ties.

Rubinoff and Schmitz estimate that this assemblage of species has probably been evolving in the Hawaiian Islands for roughly 20 million years. The dating comes from a three-gene analysis of 89 species, calibrated with the ages of various islands. Each species has so far been found on only one island, typically in only one locale. Three separate lineages of moth independently developed this ability at different points in the past.
