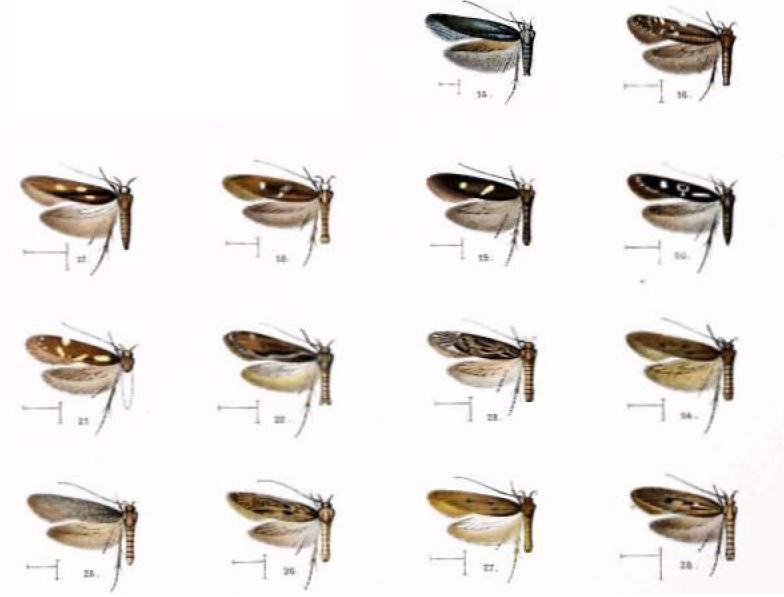
- Illustrations in Fauna Hawaiiensis: 15. Hyposmocoma niger, 16. Hyposmocoma lacertella, 17. Hyposmocoma trilunella, 18. Hyposmocoma niveiceps, 19. Hyposmocoma punctifumella, 20. Hyposmocoma lunifer, 21. Hyposmocoma punctiplicata, 22. Hyposmocoma marginenotata, 23. Hyposmocoma vermiculata, 24. Hyposmocoma enixa, 25. Hyposmocoma lugens, 26. Hyposmocoma ocellata, 27. Hyposmocoma adolescens, 28. Hyposmocoma emendata

Scientific classification
- Domain: Eukaryota
- Kingdom: Animalia
- Phylum: Arthropoda
- Class: Insecta
- Order: Lepidoptera
- Family: Cosmopterigidae
- Genus: Hyposmocoma
- Species: H. enixa

Binomial name
- Hyposmocoma enixa Walsingham, 1907

= Hyposmocoma enixa =

Species of moth

Hyposmocoma enixa is a species of moth of the family Cosmopterigidae. It was first described by Lord Walsingham in 1907. It is endemic to the Hawaiian island of Kauai. The type locality is Kaholuamano, where it was collected at an elevation of 4,000 feet (1,200 m).
