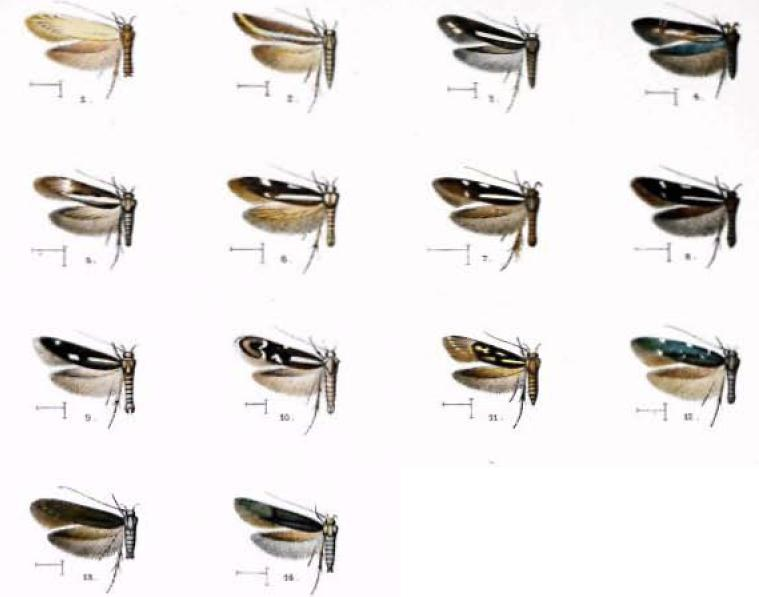
- Illustrations in Fauna Hawaiiensis: 1. Hyposmocoma metallica, 2. Hyposmocoma continuella, 3. Hyposmocoma indicella, 4. Hyposmocoma patriciella, 5. Hyposmocoma butalidella, 6. Hyposmocoma unistriata, 7. Hyposmocoma ludificata, 8. Hyposmocoma lineata, 9. Hyposmocoma propinqua, 10. Hyposmocoma admirationis, 11. Hyposmocoma quadristriata, 12. Hyposmocoma numida, 13. Hyposmocoma nigrescens, 14. Hyposmocoma fuscopurpurea

Scientific classification
- Domain: Eukaryota
- Kingdom: Animalia
- Phylum: Arthropoda
- Class: Insecta
- Order: Lepidoptera
- Family: Cosmopterigidae
- Genus: Hyposmocoma
- Species: H. nigrescens

Binomial name
- Hyposmocoma nigrescens Walsingham, 1907

= Hyposmocoma nigrescens =

Species of moth

Hyposmocoma nigrescens is a species of moth of the family Cosmopterigidae. It was first described by Lord Walsingham in 1907. It is endemic to the island of Hawaii. The type locality is Kīlauea.
