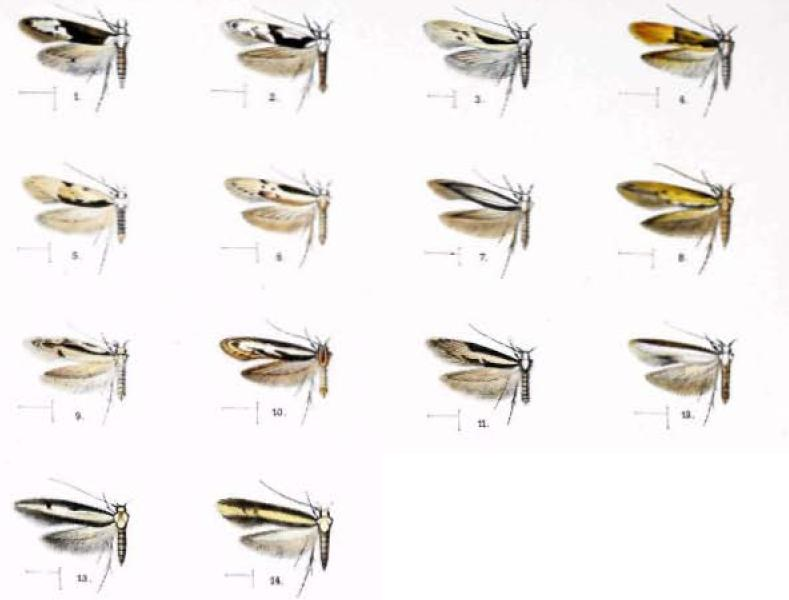
- Illustrations in Fauna Hawaiiensis: 1. Hyposmocoma lupella, 2. Hyposmocoma candidella, 3. Hyposmocoma mediella, 4. Hyposmocoma sabulella, 5. Hyposmocoma albifrontella, 6. Hyposmocoma humerovittella, 7. Hyposmocoma cincta, 8. Hyposmocoma adjacens, 9. Hyposmocoma mediospurcata, 10. Hyposmocoma tripartita, 11. Hyposmocoma thoracella, 12. Hyposmocoma limata, 13. Hyposmocoma sublimata, 14. Hyposmocoma advena

Scientific classification
- Domain: Eukaryota
- Kingdom: Animalia
- Phylum: Arthropoda
- Class: Insecta
- Order: Lepidoptera
- Family: Cosmopterigidae
- Genus: Hyposmocoma
- Species: H. lupella

Binomial name
- Hyposmocoma lupella Walsingham, 1907

= Hyposmocoma lupella =

Species of moth

Hyposmocoma lupella is a species of moth of the family Cosmopterigidae. It was first described by Lord Walsingham in 1907. It is endemic to the Hawaiian island of Kauai. Examples have been collected at Kaholuamano, at an altitude of 4,000 feet (1,200 m).

The moth's food source is unknown, but the larvae are expected to be found on dead wood and are presumed to be case-makers.
