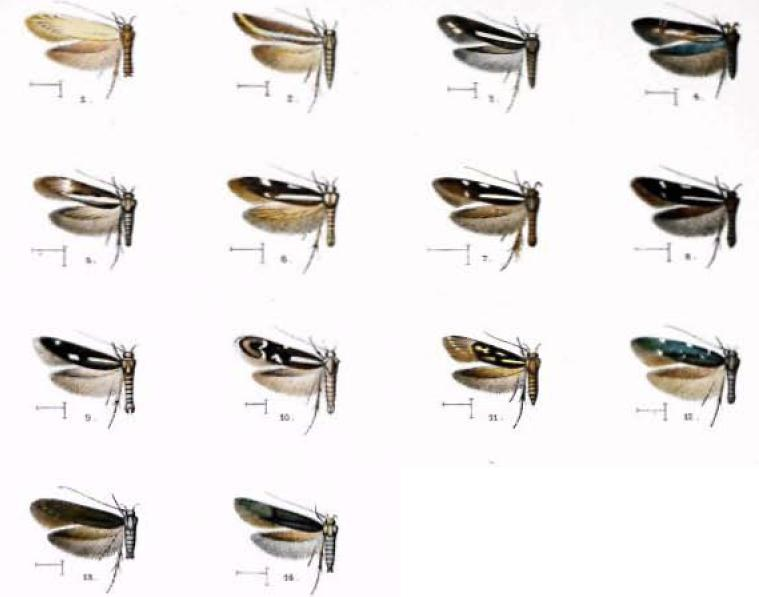
- Illustrations in Fauna Hawaiiensis: 1. Hyposmocoma metallica, 2. Hyposmocoma continuella, 3. Hyposmocoma indicella, 4. Hyposmocoma patriciella, 5. Hyposmocoma butalidella, 6. Hyposmocoma unistriata, 7. Hyposmocoma ludificata, 8. Hyposmocoma lineata, 9. Hyposmocoma propinqua, 10. Hyposmocoma admirationis, 11. Hyposmocoma quadristriata, 12. Hyposmocoma numida, 13. Hyposmocoma nigrescens, 14. Hyposmocoma fuscopurpurea

Scientific classification
- Domain: Eukaryota
- Kingdom: Animalia
- Phylum: Arthropoda
- Class: Insecta
- Order: Lepidoptera
- Family: Cosmopterigidae
- Genus: Hyposmocoma
- Species: H. admirationis

Binomial name
- Hyposmocoma admirationis Walsingham, 1907

= Hyposmocoma admirationis =

Species of moth

Hyposmocoma admirationis is a species of moth of the family Cosmopterigidae. It was first described by Lord Walsingham in 1907. It is endemic to the Hawaiian island of Molokai.
