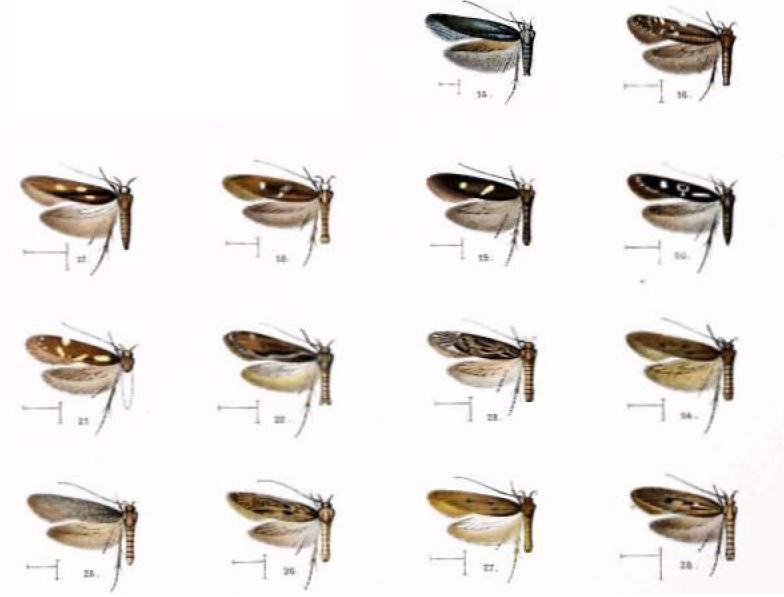
- Illustrations in Fauna Hawaiiensis: 15. Hyposmocoma niger, 16. Hyposmocoma lacertella, 17. Hyposmocoma trilunella, 18. Hyposmocoma niveiceps, 19. Hyposmocoma punctifumella, 20. Hyposmocoma lunifer, 21. Hyposmocoma punctiplicata, 22. Hyposmocoma marginenotata, 23. Hyposmocoma vermiculata, 24. Hyposmocoma enixa, 25. Hyposmocoma lugens, 26. Hyposmocoma ocellata, 27. Hyposmocoma adolescens, 28. Hyposmocoma emendata

Scientific classification
- Domain: Eukaryota
- Kingdom: Animalia
- Phylum: Arthropoda
- Class: Insecta
- Order: Lepidoptera
- Family: Cosmopterigidae
- Genus: Hyposmocoma
- Species: H. lugens

Binomial name
- Hyposmocoma lugens Walsingham, 1907

= Hyposmocoma lugens =

Species of moth

Hyposmocoma lugens is a species of moth of the family Cosmopterigidae. Lord Walsingham first described it in 1907. It is endemic to the Hawaiian island of Maui.
