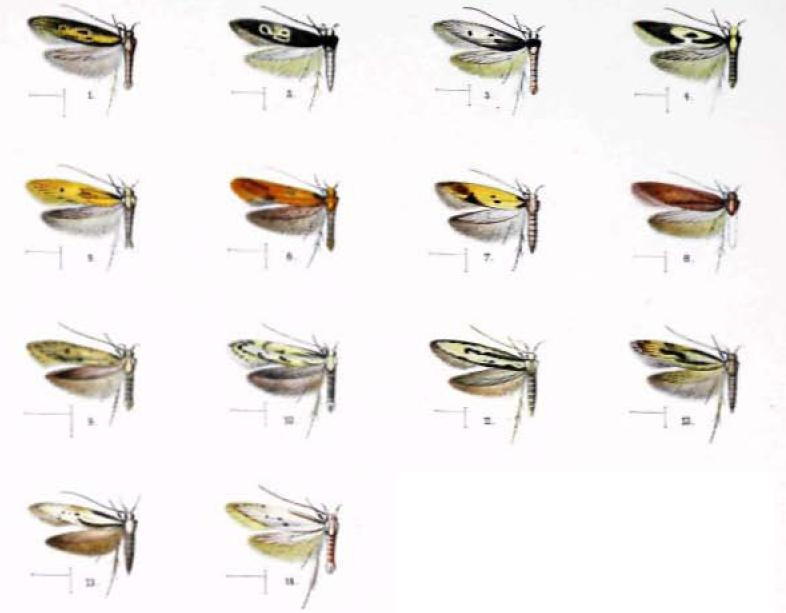
- Illustrations in Fauna Hawaiiensis: 1. Hyposmocoma ensifer, 2. Hyposmocoma tricincta, 3. Hyposmocoma semifuscata, 4. Hyposmocoma pucciniella, 5. Hyposmocoma scepticella dubia, 6. Hyposmocoma scepticella scepticella, 7. Hyposmocoma stigmatella, 8. Hyposmocoma pallidipalpis, 9. Hyposmocoma genitalis, 10. Hyposmocoma fractinubella, 11. Hyposmocoma fractivittella, 12. Hyposmocoma intermixta, 13. Hyposmocoma geminella, 14· Hyposmocoma picticornis

Scientific classification
- Domain: Eukaryota
- Kingdom: Animalia
- Phylum: Arthropoda
- Class: Insecta
- Order: Lepidoptera
- Family: Cosmopterigidae
- Genus: Hyposmocoma
- Species: H. intermixta

Binomial name
- Hyposmocoma intermixta Walsingham, 1907

= Hyposmocoma intermixta =

Species of moth

Hyposmocoma intermixta is a species of moth of the family Cosmopterigidae. It was first described by Lord Walsingham in 1907. It is endemic to the Hawaiian island of Molokai.
