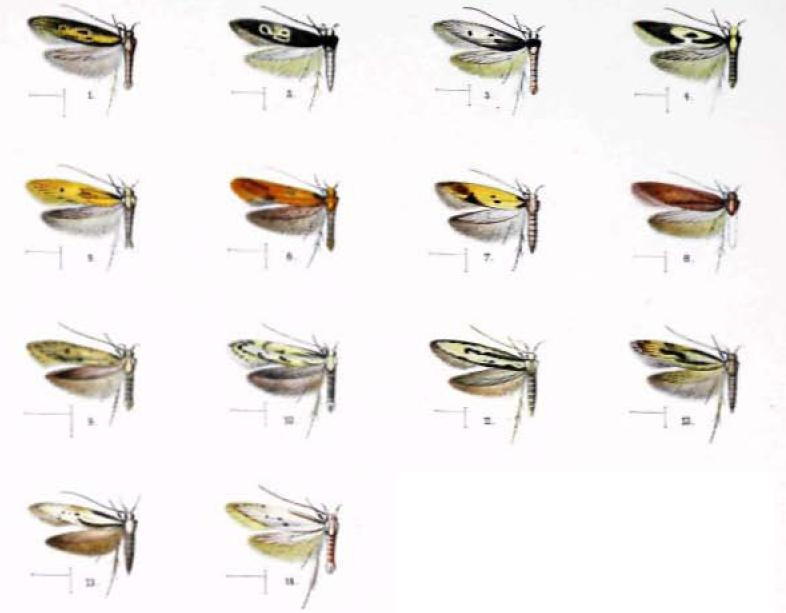
- Illustrations in Fauna Hawaiiensis: 1. Hyposmocoma ensifer, 2. Hyposmocoma tricincta, 3. Hyposmocoma semifuscata, 4. Hyposmocoma pucciniella, 5. Hyposmocoma scepticella dubia, 6. Hyposmocoma scepticella scepticella, 7. Hyposmocoma stigmatella, 8. Hyposmocoma pallidipalpis, 9. Hyposmocoma genitalis, 10. Hyposmocoma fractinubella, 11. Hyposmocoma fractivittella, 12. Hyposmocoma intermixta, 13. Hyposmocoma geminella, 14· Hyposmocoma picticornis

Scientific classification
- Domain: Eukaryota
- Kingdom: Animalia
- Phylum: Arthropoda
- Class: Insecta
- Order: Lepidoptera
- Family: Cosmopterigidae
- Genus: Hyposmocoma
- Species: H. fractivittella

Binomial name
- Hyposmocoma fractivittella Walsingham, 1907

= Hyposmocoma fractivittella =

Species of moth

Hyposmocoma fractivittella is a species of moth of the family Cosmopterigidae. It was first described by Lord Walsingham in 1907. It is endemic to the Hawaiian island of Kauai.
