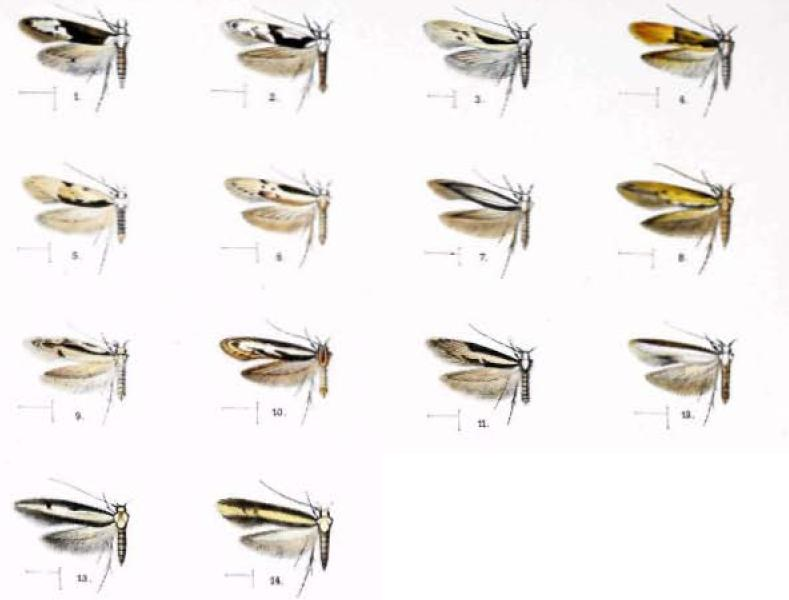
- Illustrations in Fauna Hawaiiensis: 1. Hyposmocoma lupella, 2. Hyposmocoma candidella, 3. Hyposmocoma mediella, 4. Hyposmocoma sabulella, 5. Hyposmocoma albifrontella, 6. Hyposmocoma humerovittella, 7. Hyposmocoma cincta, 8. Hyposmocoma adjacens, 9. Hyposmocoma mediospurcata, 10. Hyposmocoma tripartita, 11. Hyposmocoma thoracella, 12. Hyposmocoma limata, 13. Hyposmocoma sublimata, 14. Hyposmocoma advena

Scientific classification
- Domain: Eukaryota
- Kingdom: Animalia
- Phylum: Arthropoda
- Class: Insecta
- Order: Lepidoptera
- Family: Cosmopterigidae
- Genus: Hyposmocoma
- Species: H. mediospurcata

Binomial name
- Hyposmocoma mediospurcata Walsingham, 1907

= Hyposmocoma mediospurcata =

Species of moth

Hyposmocoma mediospurcata is a species of moth of the family Cosmopterigidae. It was first described by Lord Walsingham in 1907. It is endemic to the island of Hawaii. The type locality is Kīlauea.
