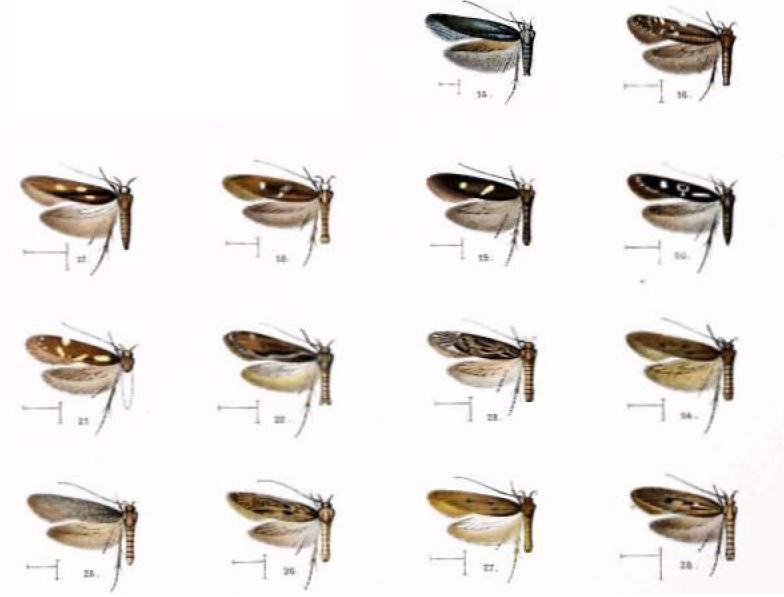
- Illustrations in Fauna Hawaiiensis: 15. Hyposmocoma niger, 16. Hyposmocoma lacertella, 17. Hyposmocoma trilunella, 18. Hyposmocoma niveiceps, 19. Hyposmocoma punctifumella, 20. Hyposmocoma lunifer, 21. Hyposmocoma punctiplicata, 22. Hyposmocoma marginenotata, 23. Hyposmocoma vermiculata, 24. Hyposmocoma enixa, 25. Hyposmocoma lugens, 26. Hyposmocoma ocellata, 27. Hyposmocoma adolescens, 28. Hyposmocoma emendata

Scientific classification
- Domain: Eukaryota
- Kingdom: Animalia
- Phylum: Arthropoda
- Class: Insecta
- Order: Lepidoptera
- Family: Cosmopterigidae
- Genus: Hyposmocoma
- Species: H. marginenotata

Binomial name
- Hyposmocoma marginenotata Walsingham, 1907

= Hyposmocoma marginenotata =

Species of moth

Hyposmocoma marginenotata is a species of moth of the family Cosmopterigidae. It was first described by Lord Walsingham in 1907. It is endemic to the Hawaiian island of Kauai.
