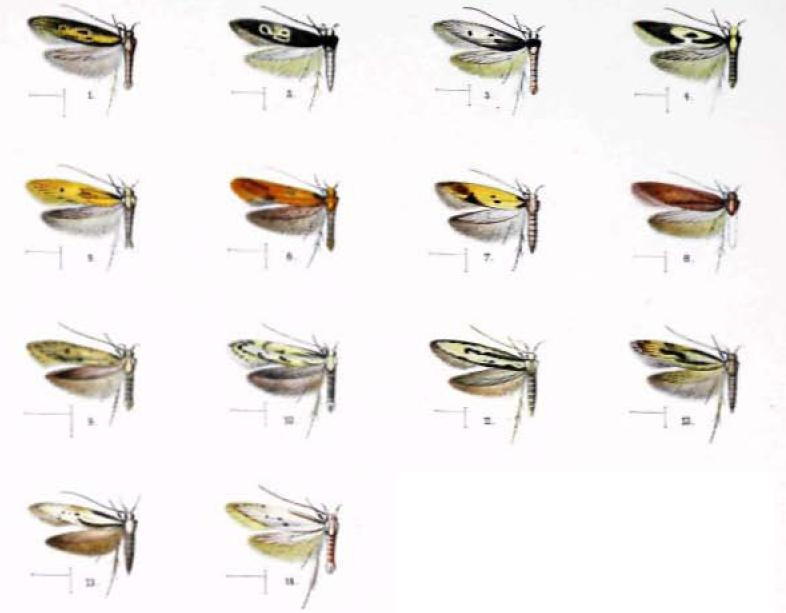
- Illustrations in Fauna Hawaiiensis: 1. Hyposmocoma ensifer, 2. Hyposmocoma tricincta, 3. Hyposmocoma semifuscata, 4. Hyposmocoma pucciniella, 5. Hyposmocoma scepticella dubia, 6. Hyposmocoma scepticella scepticella, 7. Hyposmocoma stigmatella, 8. Hyposmocoma pallidipalpis, 9. Hyposmocoma genitalis, 10. Hyposmocoma fractinubella, 11. Hyposmocoma fractivittella, 12. Hyposmocoma intermixta, 13. Hyposmocoma geminella, 14· Hyposmocoma picticornis

Scientific classification
- Domain: Eukaryota
- Kingdom: Animalia
- Phylum: Arthropoda
- Class: Insecta
- Order: Lepidoptera
- Family: Cosmopterigidae
- Genus: Hyposmocoma
- Species: H. pucciniella

Binomial name
- Hyposmocoma pucciniella Walsingham, 1907

= Hyposmocoma pucciniella =

Species of moth

Hyposmocoma pucciniella is a species of moth of the family Cosmopterigidae. It was first described by Lord Walsingham in 1907. It is endemic to the island of Hawaii. The type locality is Kīlauea.
