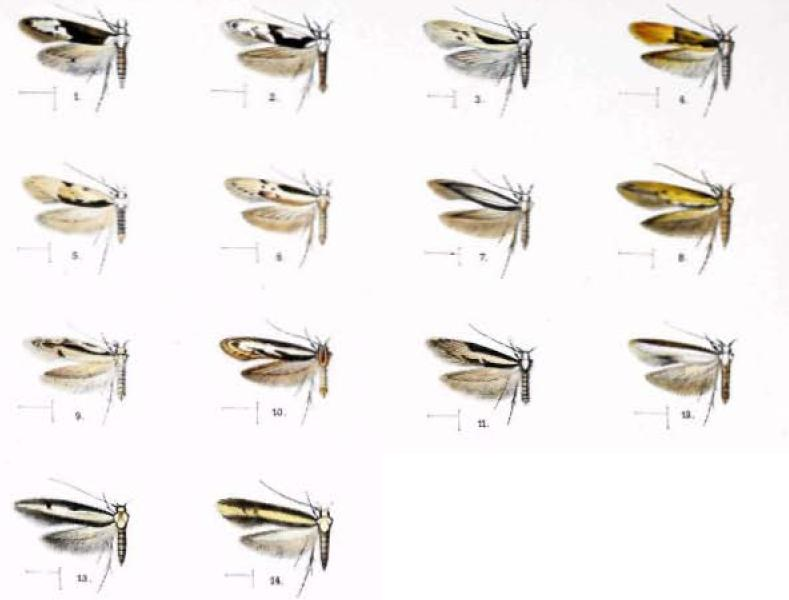
- Illustrations in Fauna Hawaiiensis: 1. Hyposmocoma lupella, 2. Hyposmocoma candidella, 3. Hyposmocoma mediella, 4. Hyposmocoma sabulella, 5. Hyposmocoma albifrontella, 6. Hyposmocoma humerovittella, 7. Hyposmocoma cincta, 8. Hyposmocoma adjacens, 9. Hyposmocoma mediospurcata, 10. Hyposmocoma tripartita, 11. Hyposmocoma thoracella, 12. Hyposmocoma limata, 13. Hyposmocoma sublimata, 14. Hyposmocoma advena

Scientific classification
- Domain: Eukaryota
- Kingdom: Animalia
- Phylum: Arthropoda
- Class: Insecta
- Order: Lepidoptera
- Family: Cosmopterigidae
- Genus: Hyposmocoma
- Species: H. advena

Binomial name
- Hyposmocoma advena Walsingham, 1907

= Hyposmocoma advena =

Species of moth

Hyposmocoma advena is a species of moth of the family Cosmopterigidae. It was first described by Lord Walsingham in 1907. It is endemic to the Hawaiian island of Molokai.
