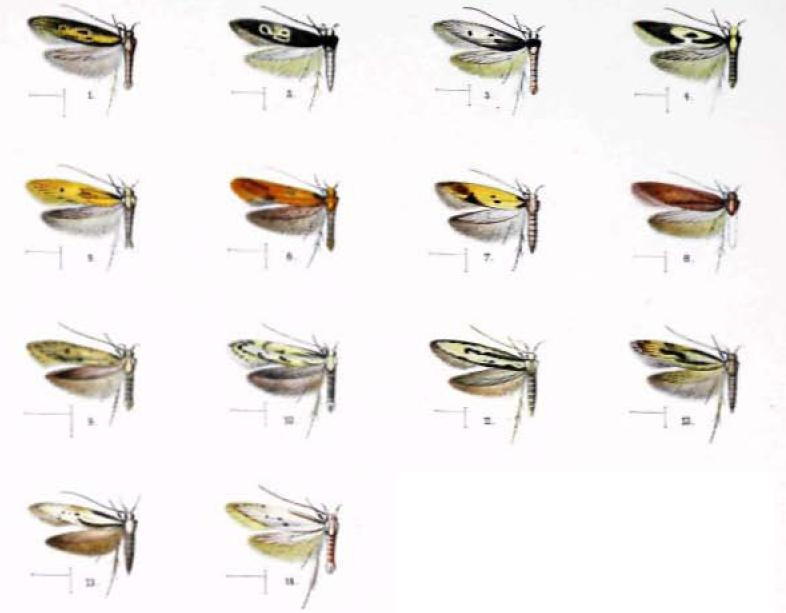
- Illustrations in Fauna Hawaiiensis: 1. Hyposmocoma ensifer, 2. Hyposmocoma tricincta, 3. Hyposmocoma semifuscata, 4. Hyposmocoma pucciniella, 5. Hyposmocoma scepticella dubia, 6. Hyposmocoma scepticella scepticella, 7. Hyposmocoma stigmatella, 8. Hyposmocoma pallidipalpis, 9. Hyposmocoma genitalis, 10. Hyposmocoma fractinubella, 11. Hyposmocoma fractivittella, 12. Hyposmocoma intermixta, 13. Hyposmocoma geminella, 14· Hyposmocoma picticornis

Scientific classification
- Domain: Eukaryota
- Kingdom: Animalia
- Phylum: Arthropoda
- Class: Insecta
- Order: Lepidoptera
- Family: Cosmopterigidae
- Genus: Hyposmocoma
- Species: H. scepticella

Binomial name
- Hyposmocoma scepticella (Walsingham, 1907)

Synonyms
- Hyposmocoma scepticella var. scepticella Walsingham, 1907; Hyposmocoma scepticella var. dubia Walsingham, 1907

= Hyposmocoma scepticella =

Species of moth

Hyposmocoma scepticella is a species of moth of the family Cosmopterigidae. It was first described by Lord Walsingham in 1907. It is endemic to the Hawaiian island of Maui. The type locality is Olinda, where it was collected at an elevation of 4,000 feet (1,200 m).
