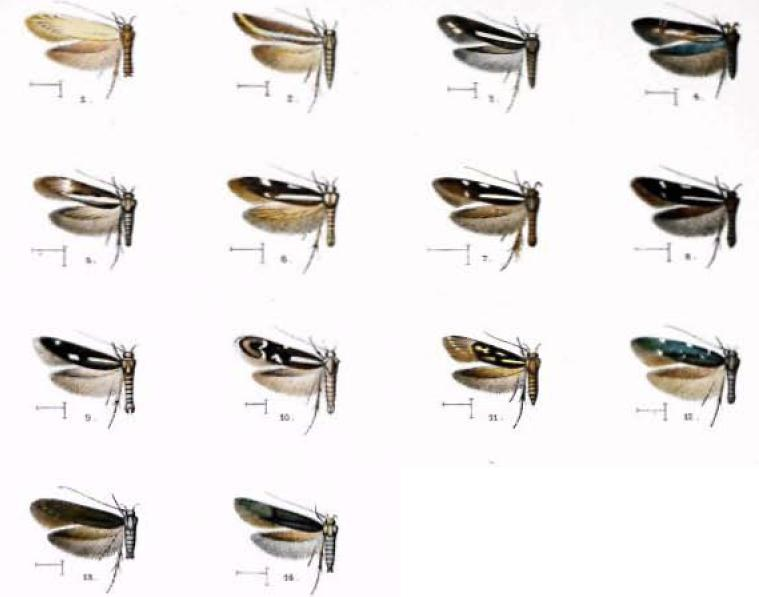
- Illustrations in Fauna Hawaiiensis: 1. Hyposmocoma metallica, 2. Hyposmocoma continuella, 3. Hyposmocoma indicella, 4. Hyposmocoma patriciella, 5. Hyposmocoma butalidella, 6. Hyposmocoma unistriata, 7. Hyposmocoma ludificata, 8. Hyposmocoma lineata, 9. Hyposmocoma propinqua, 10. Hyposmocoma admirationis, 11. Hyposmocoma quadristriata, 12. Hyposmocoma numida, 13. Hyposmocoma nigrescens, 14. Hyposmocoma fuscopurpurea

Scientific classification
- Domain: Eukaryota
- Kingdom: Animalia
- Phylum: Arthropoda
- Class: Insecta
- Order: Lepidoptera
- Family: Cosmopterigidae
- Genus: Hyposmocoma
- Species: H. butalidella

Binomial name
- Hyposmocoma butalidella Walsingham, 1907

= Hyposmocoma butalidella =

Species of moth

Hyposmocoma butalidella is a species of moth of the family Cosmopterigidae. It was first described by Lord Walsingham in 1907. It is endemic to the Hawaiian island of Maui. The type locality is Haleakalā, where it was collected at an elevation of 7,000 feet (2,100 m).
