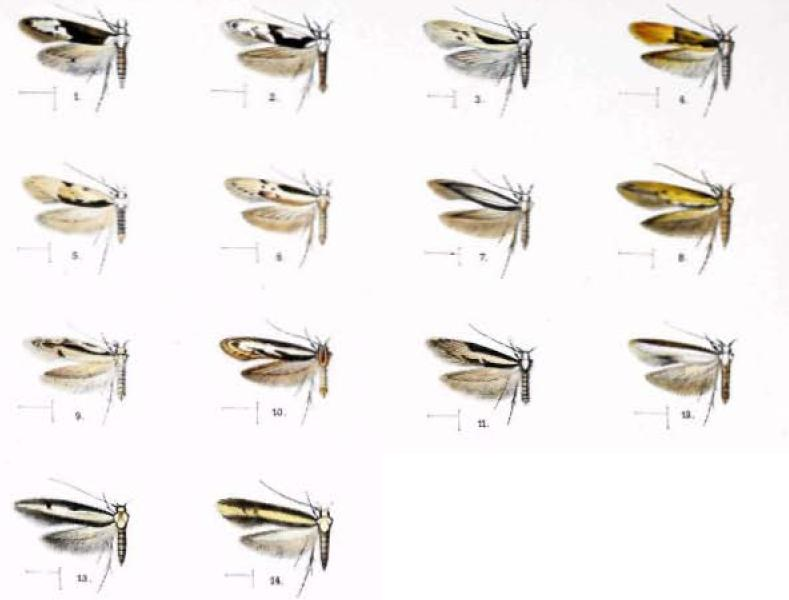
- Illustrations in Fauna Hawaiiensis: 1. Hyposmocoma lupella, 2. Hyposmocoma candidella, 3. Hyposmocoma mediella, 4. Hyposmocoma sabulella, 5. Hyposmocoma albifrontella, 6. Hyposmocoma humerovittella, 7. Hyposmocoma cincta, 8. Hyposmocoma adjacens, 9. Hyposmocoma mediospurcata, 10. Hyposmocoma tripartita, 11. Hyposmocoma thoracella, 12. Hyposmocoma limata, 13. Hyposmocoma sublimata, 14. Hyposmocoma advena

Scientific classification
- Domain: Eukaryota
- Kingdom: Animalia
- Phylum: Arthropoda
- Class: Insecta
- Order: Lepidoptera
- Family: Cosmopterigidae
- Genus: Hyposmocoma
- Species: H. candidella

Binomial name
- Hyposmocoma candidella (Walsingham, 1907)

Synonyms
- Hyposmocoma lupella var. candidella Walsingham, 1907

= Hyposmocoma candidella =

Species of moth

Hyposmocoma candidella is a species of moth of the family Cosmopterigidae. It was first described by Lord Walsingham in 1907. It is endemic to the island of Hawaii. The type locality is Kona, where it was collected at an elevation of 4,000 feet (1,200 m).

The larvae probably feed on Acacia koa.
