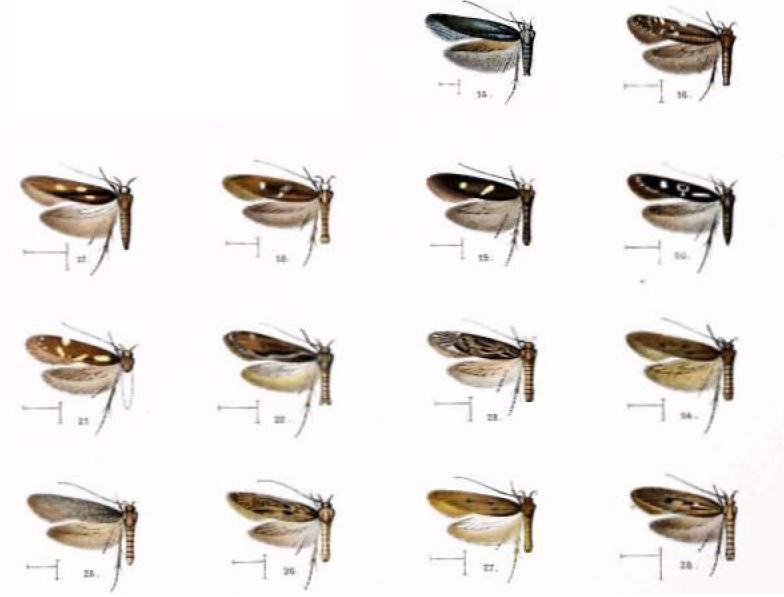
- Illustrations in Fauna Hawaiiensis: 15. Hyposmocoma niger, 16. Hyposmocoma lacertella, 17. Hyposmocoma trilunella, 18. Hyposmocoma niveiceps, 19. Hyposmocoma punctifumella, 20. Hyposmocoma lunifer, 21. Hyposmocoma punctiplicata, 22. Hyposmocoma marginenotata, 23. Hyposmocoma vermiculata, 24. Hyposmocoma enixa, 25. Hyposmocoma lugens, 26. Hyposmocoma ocellata, 27. Hyposmocoma adolescens, 28. Hyposmocoma emendata

Scientific classification
- Domain: Eukaryota
- Kingdom: Animalia
- Phylum: Arthropoda
- Class: Insecta
- Order: Lepidoptera
- Family: Cosmopterigidae
- Genus: Hyposmocoma
- Species: H. niveiceps

Binomial name
- Hyposmocoma niveiceps Walsingham, 1907

= Hyposmocoma niveiceps =

Species of moth

Hyposmocoma niveiceps is a species of moth of the family Cosmopterigidae. It was first described by Lord Walsingham in 1907. It is endemic to the Hawaiian islands of Molokai and Lanai.
