= Fauna Hawaiiensis =

Scientific publication

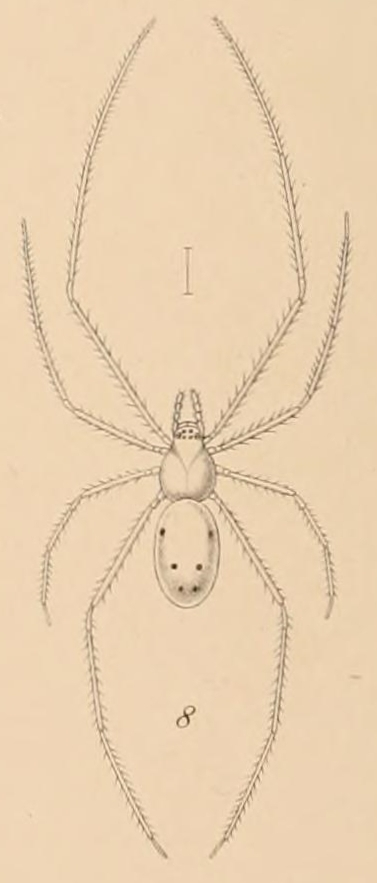
Theridion Grallator Female

Fauna Hawaiiensis, or Zoology of the Sandwich (Hawaiian) Isles, is a three-volume work on the fauna of Hawaii, published between 1899 and 1913 and edited by David Sharp.
