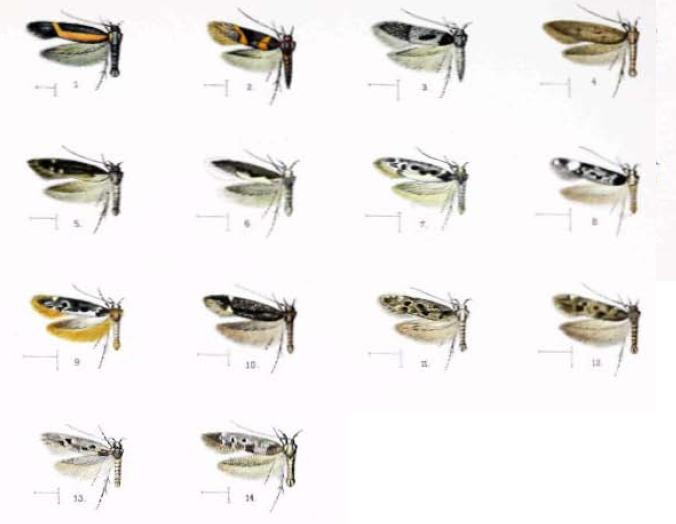
- Illustrations in Fauna Hawaiiensis: 1. Hyposmocoma auropurpurea, 2. Hyposmocoma inversella, 3. Hyposmocoma vinicolor, 4. Hyposmocoma adelphella, 5. Hyposmocoma metrosiderella, 6. Hyposmocoma similis, 7. Hyposmocoma calva, 8. Hyposmocoma tarsimaculata, 9. Hyposmocoma ochreociliata, 10. Hyposmocoma malornata, 11. Hyposmocoma quinquemaculata, 12. Hyposmocoma conditella, 13. Hyposmocoma montivolans, 14. Hyposmocoma iodes

Scientific classification
- Domain: Eukaryota
- Kingdom: Animalia
- Phylum: Arthropoda
- Class: Insecta
- Order: Lepidoptera
- Family: Cosmopterigidae
- Genus: Hyposmocoma
- Species: H. quinquemaculata

Binomial name
- Hyposmocoma quinquemaculata Walsingham, 1907

= Hyposmocoma quinquemaculata =

Species of moth

Hyposmocoma quinquemaculata is a species of moth of the family Cosmopterigidae. It was first described by Lord Walsingham in 1907. It is endemic to the island of Hawaii. The type locality is Kona, where it was collected at an elevation of 4,000 feet (1,200 m).
