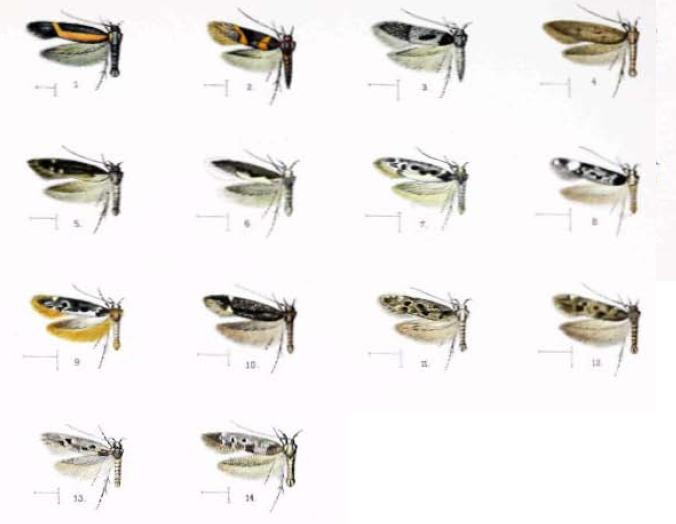
- Illustrations in Fauna Hawaiiensis: 1. Hyposmocoma auropurpurea, 2. Hyposmocoma inversella, 3. Hyposmocoma vinicolor, 4. Hyposmocoma adelphella, 5. Hyposmocoma metrosiderella, 6. Hyposmocoma similis, 7. Hyposmocoma calva, 8. Hyposmocoma tarsimaculata, 9. Hyposmocoma ochreociliata, 10. Hyposmocoma malornata, 11. Hyposmocoma quinquemaculata, 12. Hyposmocoma conditella, 13. Hyposmocoma montivolans, 14. Hyposmocoma iodes

Scientific classification
- Domain: Eukaryota
- Kingdom: Animalia
- Phylum: Arthropoda
- Class: Insecta
- Order: Lepidoptera
- Family: Cosmopterigidae
- Genus: Hyposmocoma
- Species: H. iodes

Binomial name
- Hyposmocoma iodes Walsingham, 1907

= Hyposmocoma iodes =

Species of moth

Hyposmocoma iodes is a species of moth of the family Cosmopterigidae. It was first described by Lord Walsingham in 1907. It is endemic to the Hawaiian island of Molokai.
