= Māʻili, Hawaii =

Census-designated place in Hawaii, United States

Māʻili
- Census-designated place
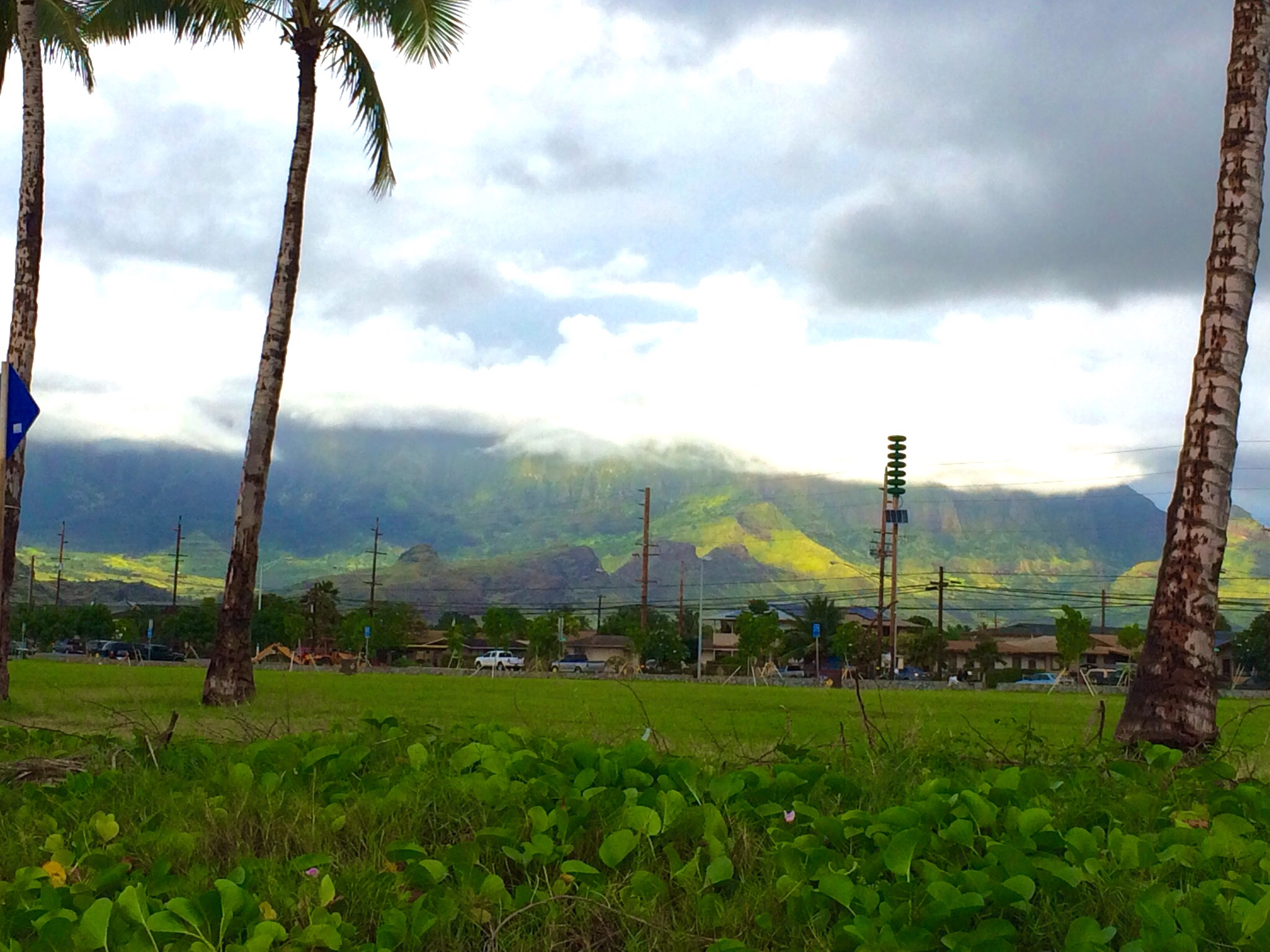
- Māʻili with the Lualualei Valley and the Waianae Range in the background.

- Location in Honolulu County and the state of Hawaii
- Coordinates: 21°25′6″N 158°10′43″W
- Country: United States
- State: Hawaii

Area
  - Total: 2.80 sq mi (7.26 km^{2})
  - Land: 1.71 sq mi (4.43 km^{2})
  - Water: 1.09 sq mi (2.83 km^{2})
- Elevation: 13 ft (4.0 m)

Population (2020)
  - Total: 11,535
  - Density: 6,749/sq mi (2,605.8/km^{2})
- Time zone: UTC-10 (Hawaii-Aleutian)
- ZIP code: 96792
- Area code: 808
- FIPS code: 15-47300
- GNIS feature ID: 0361999

Māʻili (Hawaiian pronunciation: [maːˈʔili]) is a census-designated place (CDP) in the Waiʻanae District on the island of Oʻahu, City & County of Honolulu, Hawaiʻi, United States. In Hawaiian, māʻili means "pebbly", referring to rounded stones at the shore. Māʻili is located along Farrington Highway on Oʻahu's Leeward Coast, between Māʻili Beach Park to the west and Lualualei Valley to the east. It is located 1.4 miles south of the town of Waianae, separated by the Māʻiliʻili Stream, and 1.5 miles north of Nanakuli. As of the 2020 census, the town population was 11,535. Māʻili has one 7-Eleven, a gas station, and a few residential developments. The town is also home to several dairy farms and vegetable plots. Two tall, red antennae near the mouth of the Lualualei Valley are parts of the Navcom Radio Transmitting Facility, and were the tallest man-made structures in the Western Hemisphere at 1,503 feet when they were built in 1972. The town has an elevation of 20 feet (6.1 m).

Māʻili has among the highest percentage of Native Hawaiians in Hawai’i, with 48.8% of the population in 2009. Māʻili and its waterfront park, Māʻili Beach Park, is a popular destination for surfing, snorkeling, swimming, boogieboarding, and bodyboarding. Māʻili Beach Park has a total area of forty acres, and is located immediately south of Lualualei Beach Park. The park is home to two popular Hawaiian surf spots: Green Lanterns by the mouth of the Māʻiliʻili Stream, and Tumbleland in the center of the beach park. The water conditions are treacherous during winter-time, but usually calm during summer. The beach park has a lifeguard station, a playground, beach facilities, restrooms, picnic tables, and showers.

== Geography ==
Māʻili is located at 21°25′6″N 158°10′43″W (21.418333, -158.178736). According to the United States Census Bureau, the CDP has a total area of 2.8 square miles (7.3 km^{2}), of which 1.7 square miles (4.4 km^{2}) is land and 1.1 square miles (2.8 km^{2}), or 38.92%, is water. It is located on the Waimea Coast of Oʻahu, between the ocean-front Māʻili Beach Park and the Lualualei Valley at the foot of the Waianae Range. It is located 1.4 miles south of the town of Waianae, separated by the Māʻiliʻili Stream, and 1.5 miles north of Nanakuli.

== Climate ==
Māʻili has a tropical savanna climate (Köppen: Aw).

Climate data for Maili
| Month | Jan | Feb | Mar | Apr | May | Jun | Jul | Aug | Sep | Oct | Nov | Dec | Year |
|---|---|---|---|---|---|---|---|---|---|---|---|---|---|
| Mean daily maximum °C (°F) | 23.3 (73.9) | 23.1 (73.6) | 23.2 (73.8) | 23.9 (75.0) | 24.9 (76.8) | 25.9 (78.6) | 26.4 (79.5) | 26.7 (80.1) | 26.8 (80.2) | 26.1 (79.0) | 25.1 (77.2) | 24.0 (75.2) | 25.0 (76.9) |
| Daily mean °C (°F) | 22.4 (72.3) | 22.0 (71.6) | 22.1 (71.8) | 22.8 (73.0) | 23.6 (74.5) | 24.5 (76.1) | 25.0 (77.0) | 25.3 (77.5) | 25.4 (77.7) | 25.0 (77.0) | 24.1 (75.4) | 23.1 (73.6) | 23.8 (74.8) |
| Mean daily minimum °C (°F) | 21.6 (70.9) | 21.2 (70.2) | 21.2 (70.2) | 21.9 (71.4) | 22.7 (72.9) | 23.5 (74.3) | 24.0 (75.2) | 24.3 (75.7) | 24.4 (75.9) | 24.1 (75.4) | 23.3 (73.9) | 22.4 (72.3) | 22.9 (73.2) |
| Average precipitation mm (inches) | 33.6 (1.32) | 33.5 (1.32) | 43.9 (1.73) | 17.4 (0.69) | 15.0 (0.59) | 10.9 (0.43) | 7.8 (0.31) | 11.1 (0.44) | 9.3 (0.37) | 22.1 (0.87) | 30.3 (1.19) | 49.0 (1.93) | 283.9 (11.19) |
Source: Weather.Directory

== Demographics ==
Historical population
| Census | Pop. | Note | %± |
|---|---|---|---|
| 2020 | 11,535 | | — |
U.S. Decennial Census

As of the census of 2000, there were 5,943 people, 1,359 households, and 1,178 families residing in the CDP. The population density was 6,241.5 inhabitants per square mile (2,409.9/km^{2}). There were 1,502 housing units at an average density of 1,577.5 per square mile (609.1/km^{2}). The racial makeup of the CDP was 11.07% White, 0.91% African American, 0.24% Native American, 22.56% Asian, 23.89% Pacific Islander, 1.09% from other races, and 40.23% from two or more races. Hispanic or Latino of any race were 14.67% of the population.

There were 1,359 households, out of which 42.3% had children under the age of 18 living with them, 58.9% were married couples living together, 19.8% had a female householder with no husband present, and 13.3% were non-families. 9.5% of all households were made up of individuals, and 3.8% had someone living alone who was 65 years of age or older. The average household size was 4.22 and the average family size was 4.35.

In the CDP the population was spread out, with 35.0% under the age of 18, 10.4% from 18 to 24, 27.2% from 25 to 44, 18.4% from 45 to 64, and 9.0% who were 65 years of age or older. The median age was 28 years. For every 100 females there were 103.0 males. For every 100 females age 18 and over, there were 98.3 males.

The median income for a household in the CDP was $45,786, and the median income for a family was $48,068. Males had a median income of $33,229 versus $21,211 for females. The per capita income for the CDP was $13,185. About 19.3% of families and 21.5% of the population were below the poverty line, including 28.3% of those under age 18 and 9.1% of those age 65 or over.

== Education ==
The Hawaii Department of Education operates the public schools. Maili Elementary School is located in the CDP.

Leeward Community College operates Wai‘anae Moku in Maili CDP.

== Gallery ==
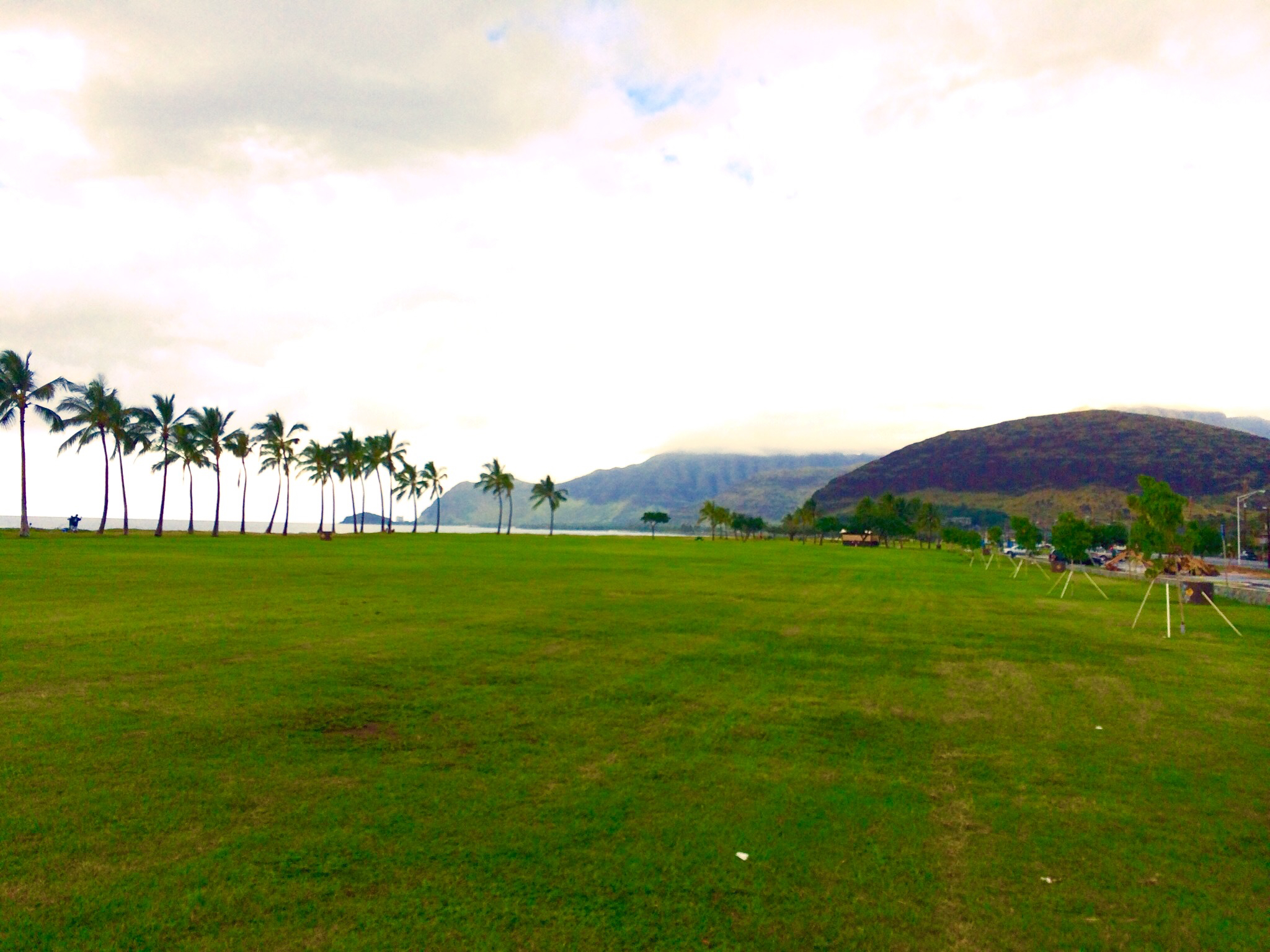
Māʻili Beach Park

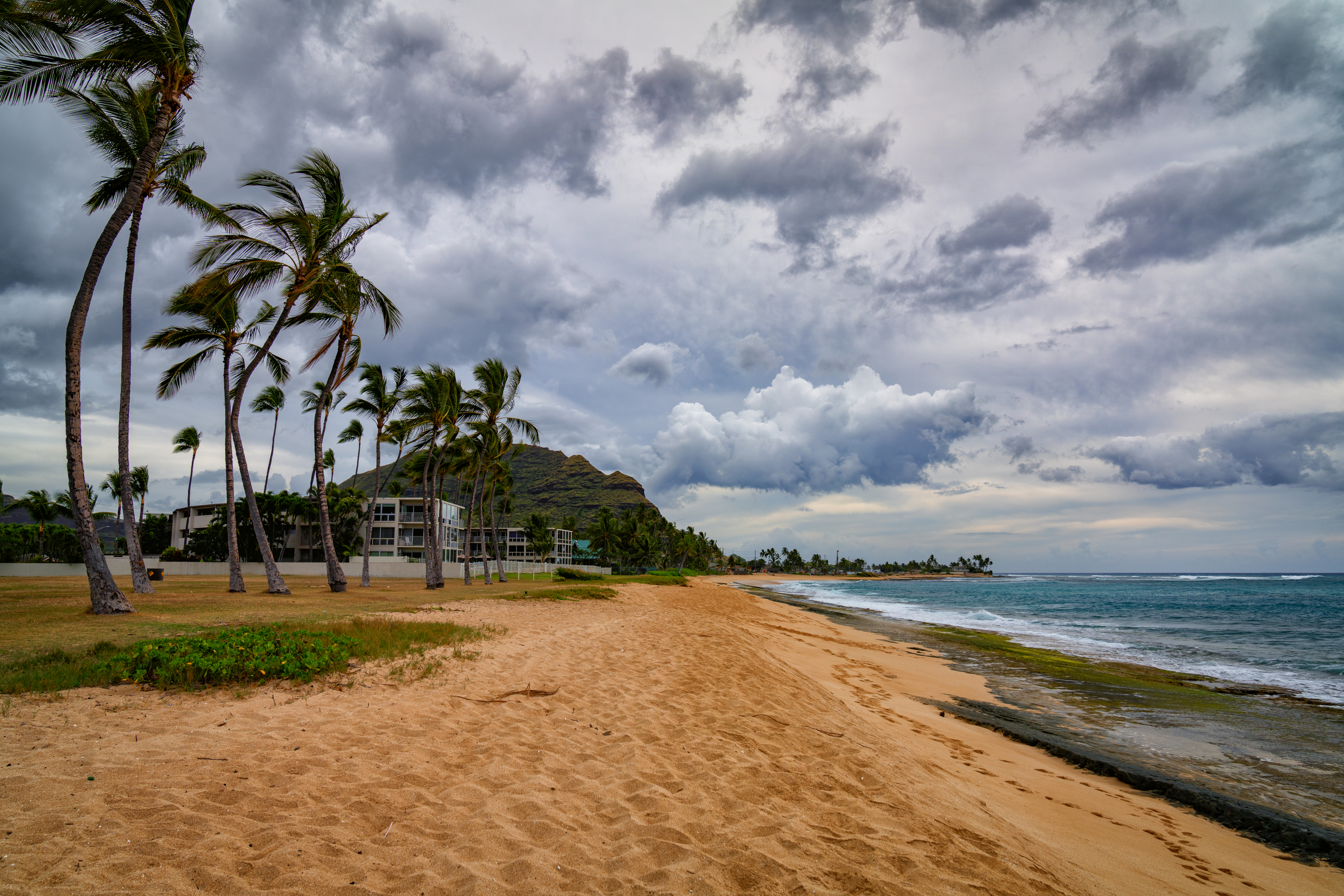
Pacific Ocean at Māʻili Beach Park
