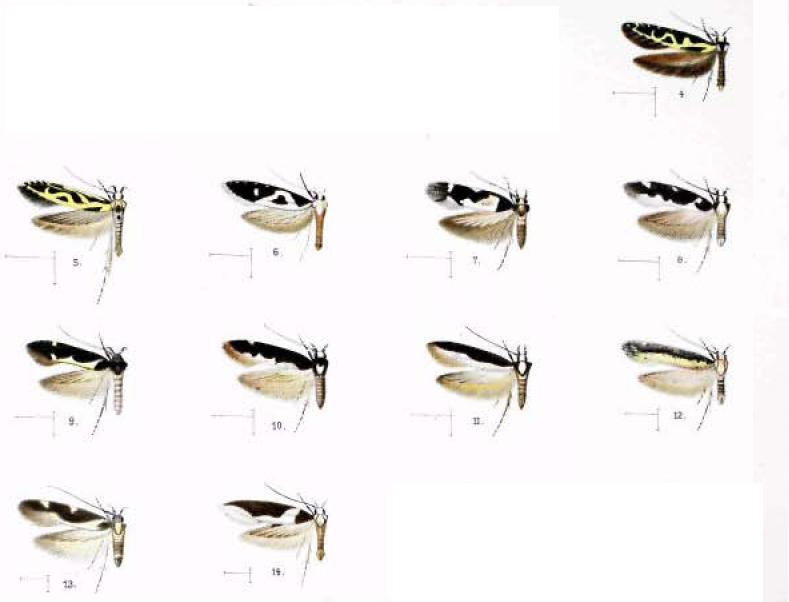
- Illustrations in Fauna Hawaiiensis: 4. Hyposmocoma exornata, 5. Hyposmocoma flavicosta, 6. Hyposmocoma oculifera, 7. Hyposmocoma nigralbida, 8. Hyposmocoma nividorsella, 9. Hyposmocoma corvina, 10. Hyposmocoma discella, 11. Hyposmocoma divisa, 12. Hyposmocoma partita, 13. Hyposmocoma trossulella, 14. Hyposmocoma atrovittella

Scientific classification
- Domain: Eukaryota
- Kingdom: Animalia
- Phylum: Arthropoda
- Class: Insecta
- Order: Lepidoptera
- Family: Cosmopterigidae
- Genus: Hyposmocoma
- Species: H. trossulella

Binomial name
- Hyposmocoma trossulella Walsingham, 1907

= Hyposmocoma trossulella =

Species of moth

Hyposmocoma trossulella is a species of moth of the family Cosmopterigidae. It was first described by Lord Walsingham in 1907. It is endemic to the Hawaiian island of Oahu. The type locality is the Waianae Range, where it was collected at an altitude of 2,000 feet (610 m).
