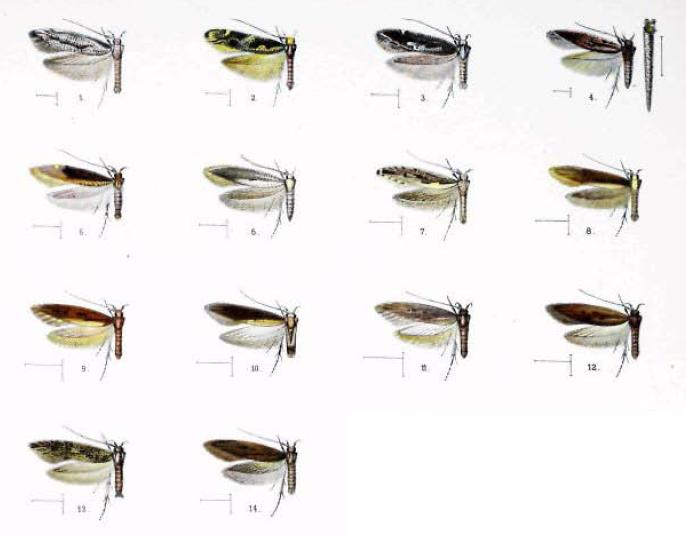
- Illustrations in Fauna Hawaiiensis: 1. Hyposmocoma canella, 2. Hyposmocoma schismatica, 3. Hyposmocoma cinereosparsa, 4. Hyposmocoma saccophora, 5. Hyposmocoma modesta, 6. Hyposmocoma tomentosa, 7. Hyposmocoma dorsella, 8. Hyposmocoma fallacella, 9. Hyposmocoma falsimella, 10. Hyposmocoma ochreovittelta, 11. Hyposmocoma quadripunctata, 12. Hyposmocoma sudorella, 13. Hyposmocoma vicina, 14. Hyposmocoma fulvida

Scientific classification
- Domain: Eukaryota
- Kingdom: Animalia
- Phylum: Arthropoda
- Class: Insecta
- Order: Lepidoptera
- Family: Cosmopterigidae
- Genus: Hyposmocoma
- Species: H. dorsella

Binomial name
- Hyposmocoma dorsella Walsingham, 1907

= Hyposmocoma dorsella =

Species of moth

Hyposmocoma dorsella is a species of moth of the family Cosmopterigidae. It is endemic to the Hawaiian island of Oahu. It was first described by Lord Walsingham in 1907. The type locality is the Waianae Range, where it was collected at an elevation of 3,000 feet (910 m).
