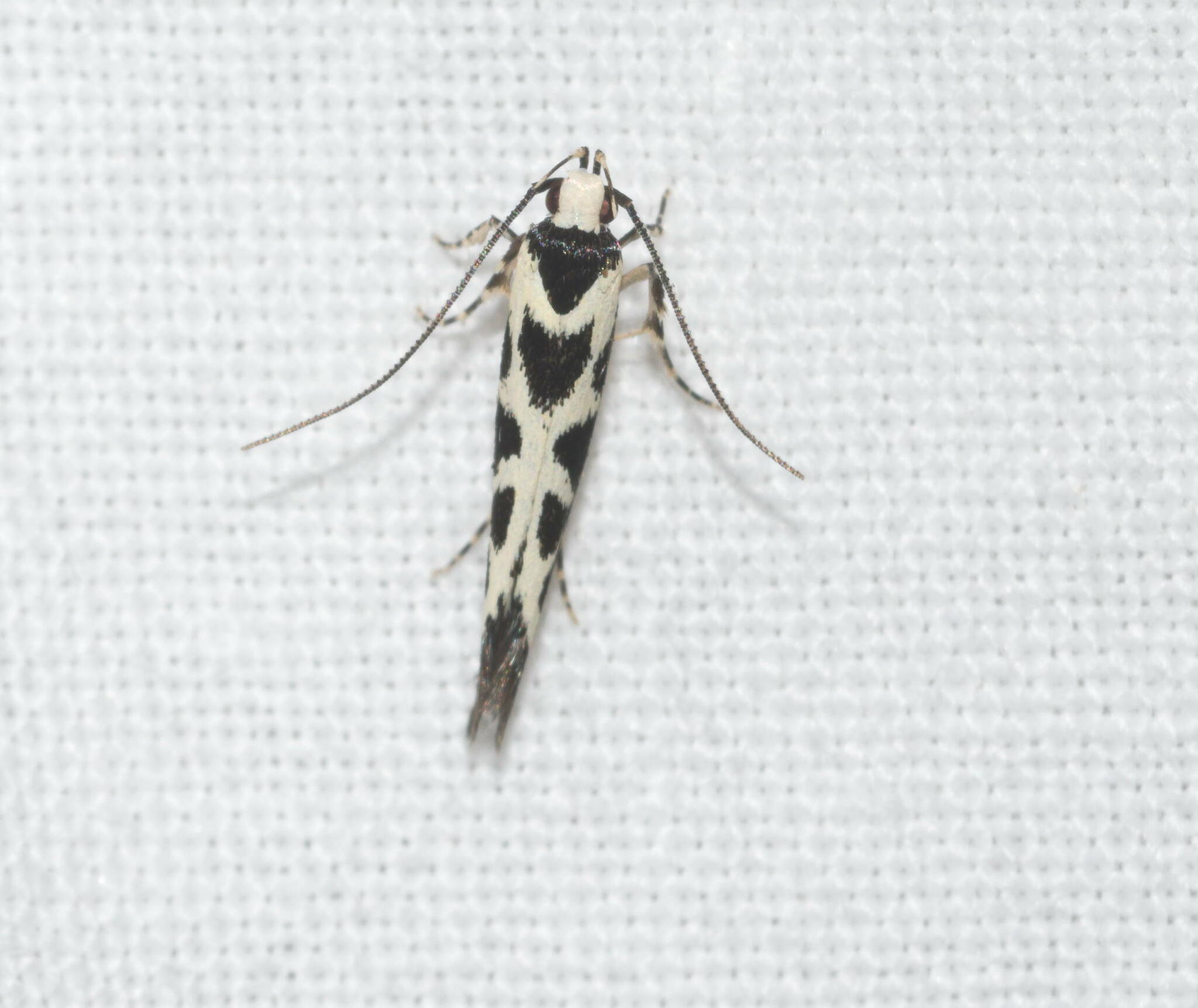
- Live specimen
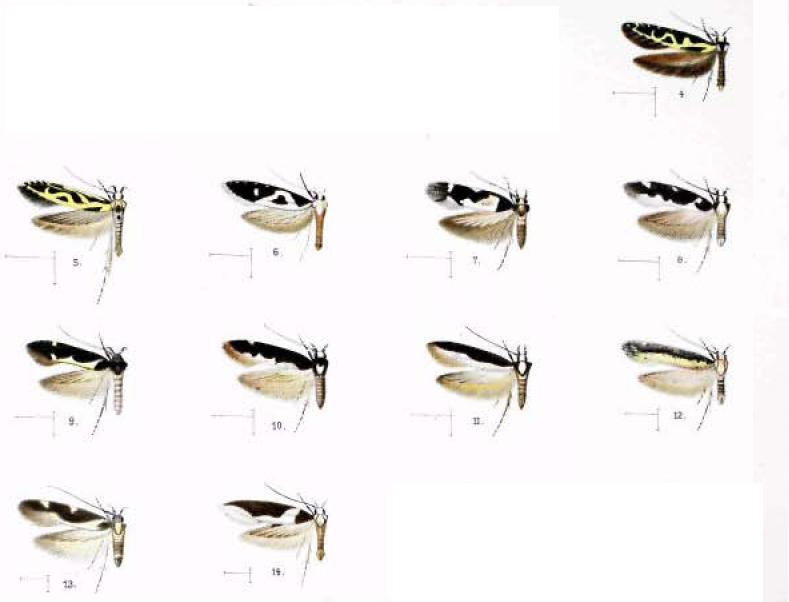
- Illustrations in Fauna Hawaiiensis: 4. Hyposmocoma exornata, 5. Hyposmocoma flavicosta, 6. Hyposmocoma oculifera, 7. Hyposmocoma nigralbida, 8. Hyposmocoma nividorsella, 9. Hyposmocoma corvina, 10. Hyposmocoma discella, 11. Hyposmocoma divisa, 12. Hyposmocoma partita, 13. Hyposmocoma trossulella, 14. Hyposmocoma atrovittella

Scientific classification
- Domain: Eukaryota
- Kingdom: Animalia
- Phylum: Arthropoda
- Class: Insecta
- Order: Lepidoptera
- Family: Cosmopterigidae
- Genus: Hyposmocoma
- Species: H. exornata

Binomial name
- Hyposmocoma exornata Walsingham, 1907

= Hyposmocoma exornata =

Species of moth

Hyposmocoma exornata is a species of moth of the family Cosmopterigidae. It was first described by Lord Walsingham in 1907. It is endemic to the island of Hawaii. The type locality is Kona.
