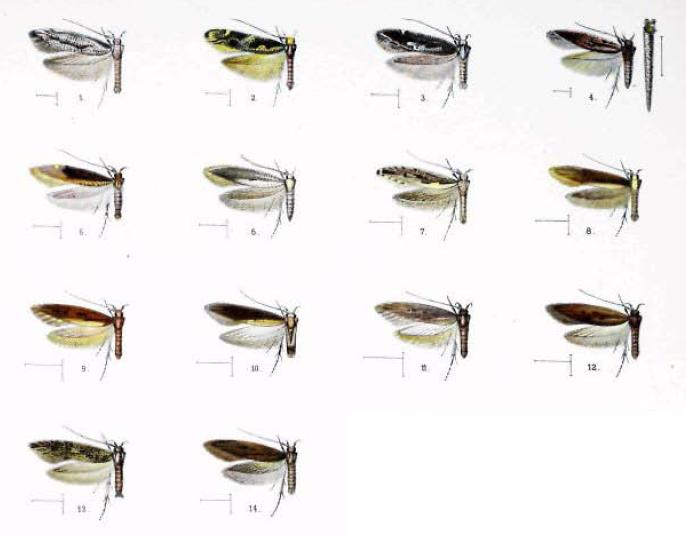
- Illustrations in Fauna Hawaiiensis: 1. Hyposmocoma canella, 2. Hyposmocoma schismatica, 3. Hyposmocoma cinereosparsa, 4. Hyposmocoma saccophora, 5. Hyposmocoma modesta, 6. Hyposmocoma tomentosa, 7. Hyposmocoma dorsella, 8. Hyposmocoma fallacella, 9. Hyposmocoma falsimella, 10. Hyposmocoma ochreovittelta, 11. Hyposmocoma quadripunctata, 12. Hyposmocoma sudorella, 13. Hyposmocoma vicina, 14. Hyposmocoma fulvida

Scientific classification
- Domain: Eukaryota
- Kingdom: Animalia
- Phylum: Arthropoda
- Class: Insecta
- Order: Lepidoptera
- Family: Cosmopterigidae
- Genus: Hyposmocoma
- Species: H. schismatica

Binomial name
- Hyposmocoma schismatica Walsingham, 1907

= Hyposmocoma schismatica =

Species of moth

Hyposmocoma schismatica is a species of moth of the family Cosmopterigidae. It was first described by Lord Walsingham in 1907. It is endemic to the Hawaiian island of Kauai. The type locality is Kaholuamano, where it was collected at an elevation of 4,000 feet (1,200 m).
