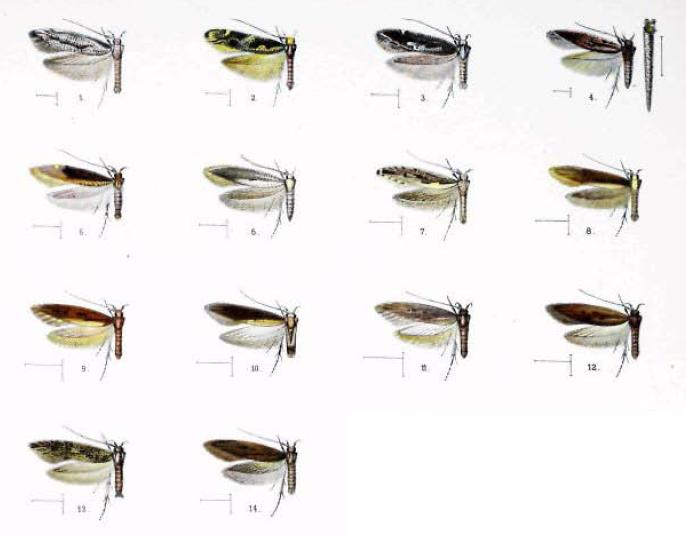
- Illustrations in Fauna Hawaiiensis: 1. Hyposmocoma canella, 2. Hyposmocoma schismatica, 3. Hyposmocoma cinereosparsa, 4. Hyposmocoma saccophora, 5. Hyposmocoma modesta, 6. Hyposmocoma tomentosa, 7. Hyposmocoma dorsella, 8. Hyposmocoma fallacella, 9. Hyposmocoma falsimella, 10. Hyposmocoma ochreovittelta, 11. Hyposmocoma quadripunctata, 12. Hyposmocoma sudorella, 13. Hyposmocoma vicina, 14. Hyposmocoma fulvida

Scientific classification
- Domain: Eukaryota
- Kingdom: Animalia
- Phylum: Arthropoda
- Class: Insecta
- Order: Lepidoptera
- Family: Cosmopterigidae
- Genus: Hyposmocoma
- Species: H. modesta

Binomial name
- Hyposmocoma modesta Walsingham, 1907

= Hyposmocoma modesta =

Species of moth

Hyposmocoma modesta is a species of moth of the family Cosmopterigidae. It was first described by Lord Walsingham in 1907. It is endemic to the Hawaiian island of Kauai.
