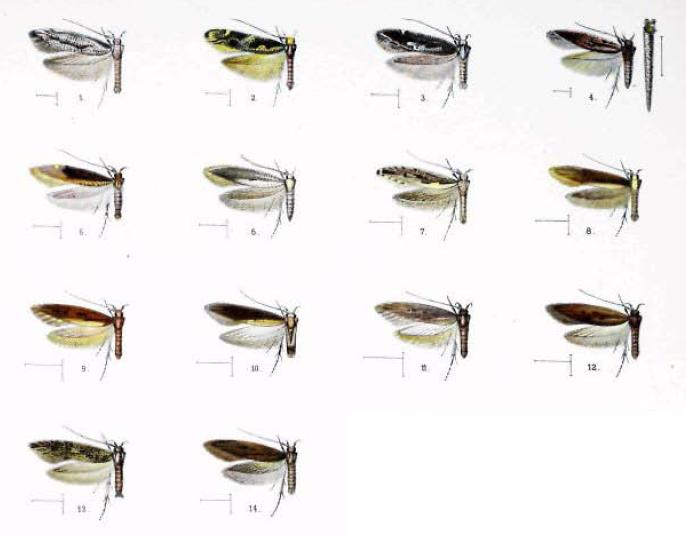
- Illustrations in Fauna Hawaiiensis: 1. Hyposmocoma canella, 2. Hyposmocoma schismatica, 3. Hyposmocoma cinereosparsa, 4. Hyposmocoma saccophora, 5. Hyposmocoma modesta, 6. Hyposmocoma tomentosa, 7. Hyposmocoma dorsella, 8. Hyposmocoma fallacella, 9. Hyposmocoma falsimella, 10. Hyposmocoma ochreovittella, 11. Hyposmocoma quadripunctata, 12. Hyposmocoma sudorella, 13. Hyposmocoma vicina, 14. Hyposmocoma fulvida

Scientific classification
- Domain: Eukaryota
- Kingdom: Animalia
- Phylum: Arthropoda
- Class: Insecta
- Order: Lepidoptera
- Family: Cosmopterigidae
- Genus: Hyposmocoma
- Species: H. ochreovittella

Binomial name
- Hyposmocoma ochreovittella Walsingham, 1907

= Hyposmocoma ochreovittella =

Species of moth

Hyposmocoma ochreovittella is a species of moth of the family Cosmopterigidae. It was first described by Lord Walsingham in 1907. It is endemic to the island of Hawaii. The type locality is Kona, where it was collected at an elevation of 4,000 feet (1,200 m).
