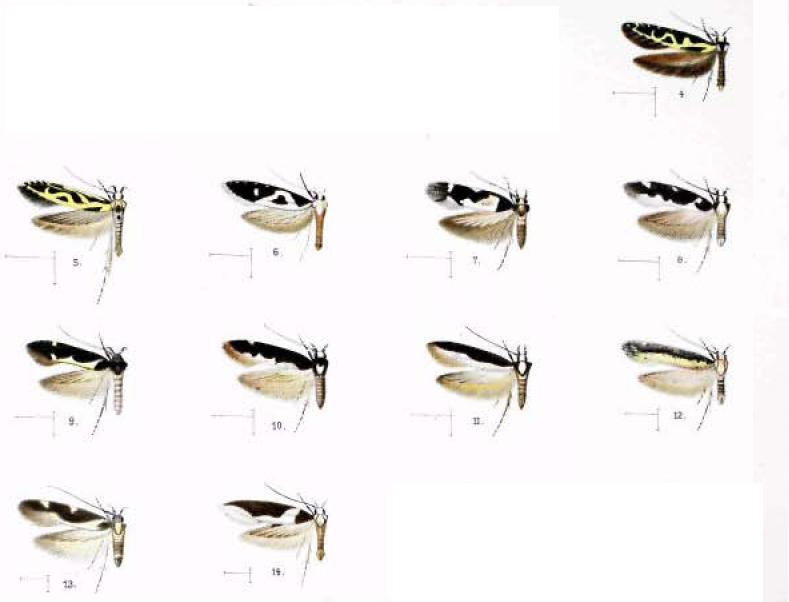
- Illustrations in Fauna Hawaiiensis: 4. Hyposmocoma exornata, 5. Hyposmocoma flavicosta, 6. Hyposmocoma oculifera, 7. Hyposmocoma nigralbida, 8. Hyposmocoma nividorsella, 9. Hyposmocoma corvina, 10. Hyposmocoma discella, 11. Hyposmocoma divisa, 12. Hyposmocoma partita, 13. Hyposmocoma trossulella, 14. Hyposmocoma atrovittella

Scientific classification
- Domain: Eukaryota
- Kingdom: Animalia
- Phylum: Arthropoda
- Class: Insecta
- Order: Lepidoptera
- Family: Cosmopterigidae
- Genus: Hyposmocoma
- Species: H. partita

Binomial name
- Hyposmocoma partita Walsingham, 1907

= Hyposmocoma partita =

Species of moth

Hyposmocoma partita is a species of moth of the family Cosmopterigidae. It was first described by Lord Walsingham in 1907. It is endemic to the island of Hawaii. The type locality is Hilo, where it was collected at an elevation of 2,000 feet (610 m).

The larva is probably a case maker.
