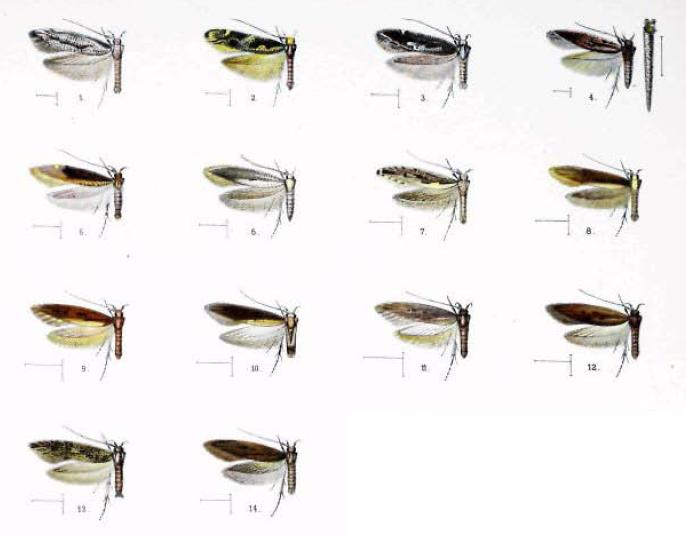
- Illustrations in Fauna Hawaiiensis: 1. Hyposmocoma canella, 2. Hyposmocoma schismatica, 3. Hyposmocoma cinereosparsa, 4. Hyposmocoma saccophora, 5. Hyposmocoma modesta, 6. Hyposmocoma tomentosa, 7. Hyposmocoma dorsella, 8. Hyposmocoma fallacella, 9. Hyposmocoma falsimella, 10. Hyposmocoma ochreovittelta, 11. Hyposmocoma quadripunctata, 12. Hyposmocoma sudorella, 13. Hyposmocoma vicina, 14. Hyposmocoma fulvida

Scientific classification
- Domain: Eukaryota
- Kingdom: Animalia
- Phylum: Arthropoda
- Class: Insecta
- Order: Lepidoptera
- Family: Cosmopterigidae
- Genus: Hyposmocoma
- Species: H. canella

Binomial name
- Hyposmocoma canella Walsingham, 1907

= Hyposmocoma canella =

Species of moth

Hyposmocoma canella is a species of moth of the family Cosmopterigidae. It is endemic to the Hawaiian islands of Kauai, Oahu, Molokai and Hawaii.

The larvae probably feed on lichens. The larvae are case-makers and have been found on rocks.
