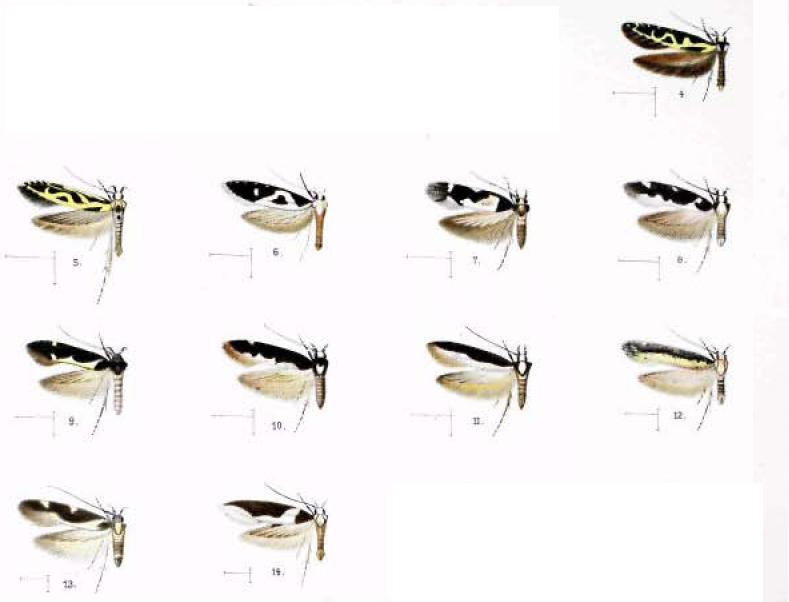
- Illustrations in Fauna Hawaiiensis: 4. Hyposmocoma exornata, 5. Hyposmocoma flavicosta, 6. Hyposmocoma oculifera, 7. Hyposmocoma nigralbida, 8. Hyposmocoma nividorsella, 9. Hyposmocoma corvina, 10. Hyposmocoma discella, 11. Hyposmocoma divisa, 12. Hyposmocoma partita, 13. Hyposmocoma trossulella, 14. Hyposmocoma atrovittella

Scientific classification
- Domain: Eukaryota
- Kingdom: Animalia
- Phylum: Arthropoda
- Class: Insecta
- Order: Lepidoptera
- Family: Cosmopterigidae
- Genus: Hyposmocoma
- Species: H. nividorsella

Binomial name
- Hyposmocoma nividorsella Walsingham, 1907

= Hyposmocoma nividorsella =

Species of moth

Hyposmocoma nividorsella is a species of moth of the family Cosmopterigidae. It was first described by Lord Walsingham in 1907. It is endemic to the Hawaiian island of Kauai.
