= Lualualei, Hawaii =

Valley on Oahu in Hawaii, United States

Coordinates: 21.4394386°N 158.1873731°W

Lualualei, Hawaii is the largest coastal valley on the leeward side of Oʻahu in Hawaiʻi. It is located on the west side of the Waianae Range.

Navy Lualualei VLF Transmitter Antennas near Lualualei, Oahu, Hawaii

== Etymology ==
The name could mean either "beloved one spared", or more likely "flexible wreath", according to Hawaiian Language expert Mary Kawena Pukui.

== Geography ==
The town on the makai side of the valley (westward towards the ocean) is Māʻili.

== United States Navy facilities ==
The valley hosts several government communication stations including USN VLF Lualualei and the USCG Communication Station Honolulu. The Naval Magazine Lualualei also is located in the valley.

The Waikele Gulch magazine was a 350-acre area where steep-banked ravines allowed tunnel construction with no two entrances facing. The construction was in response to the Commander-in-Chief of the Pacific Fleet directive to solve the problem of massive ordinance storage above ground with secure underground storage readily accessible for Pearl Harbor. Construction began in September 1942 with completion in December 1943. The completed facility had 120 tunnels 240 feet long serviced by 9 miles of railroad, 10 miles of paved road and the facilities for magazine operating personnel. On June 11, 1944 some 78 Torpex torpedo warheads exploded during transfer from a truck to a tunnel loading platform killing ten and injuring three.
