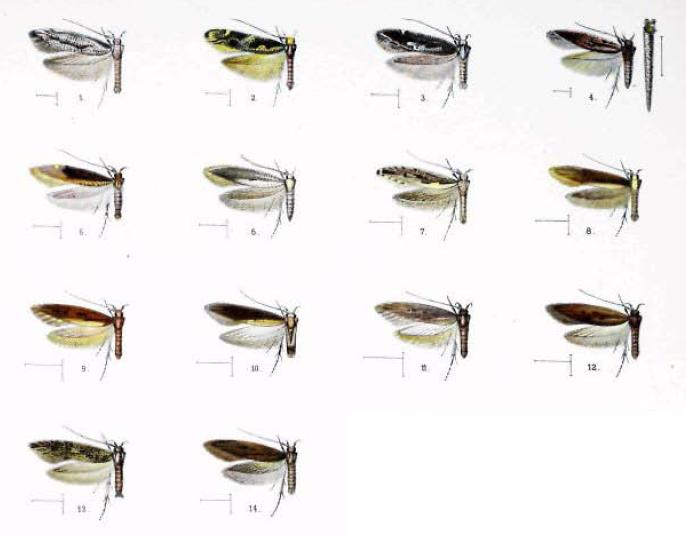
- Illustrations in Fauna Hawaiiensis: 1. Hyposmocoma canella, 2. Hyposmocoma schismatica, 3. Hyposmocoma cinereosparsa, 4. Hyposmocoma saccophora, 5. Hyposmocoma modesta, 6. Hyposmocoma tomentosa, 7. Hyposmocoma dorsella, 8. Hyposmocoma fallacella, 9. Hyposmocoma falsimella, 10. Hyposmocoma ochreovittella, 11. Hyposmocoma quadripunctata, 12. Hyposmocoma sudorella, 13. Hyposmocoma vicina, 14. Hyposmocoma fulvida

Scientific classification
- Domain: Eukaryota
- Kingdom: Animalia
- Phylum: Arthropoda
- Class: Insecta
- Order: Lepidoptera
- Family: Cosmopterigidae
- Genus: Hyposmocoma
- Species: H. fulvida

Binomial name
- Hyposmocoma fulvida Walsingham, 1907

= Hyposmocoma fulvida =

Species of moth

Hyposmocoma fulvida is a species of moth of the family Cosmopterigidae. It was first described by Lord Walsingham in 1907. It is endemic to the Hawaiian islands of Kauai and Molokai.
