= Waiʻanae Range =

Remains of ancient Hawaiian volcano

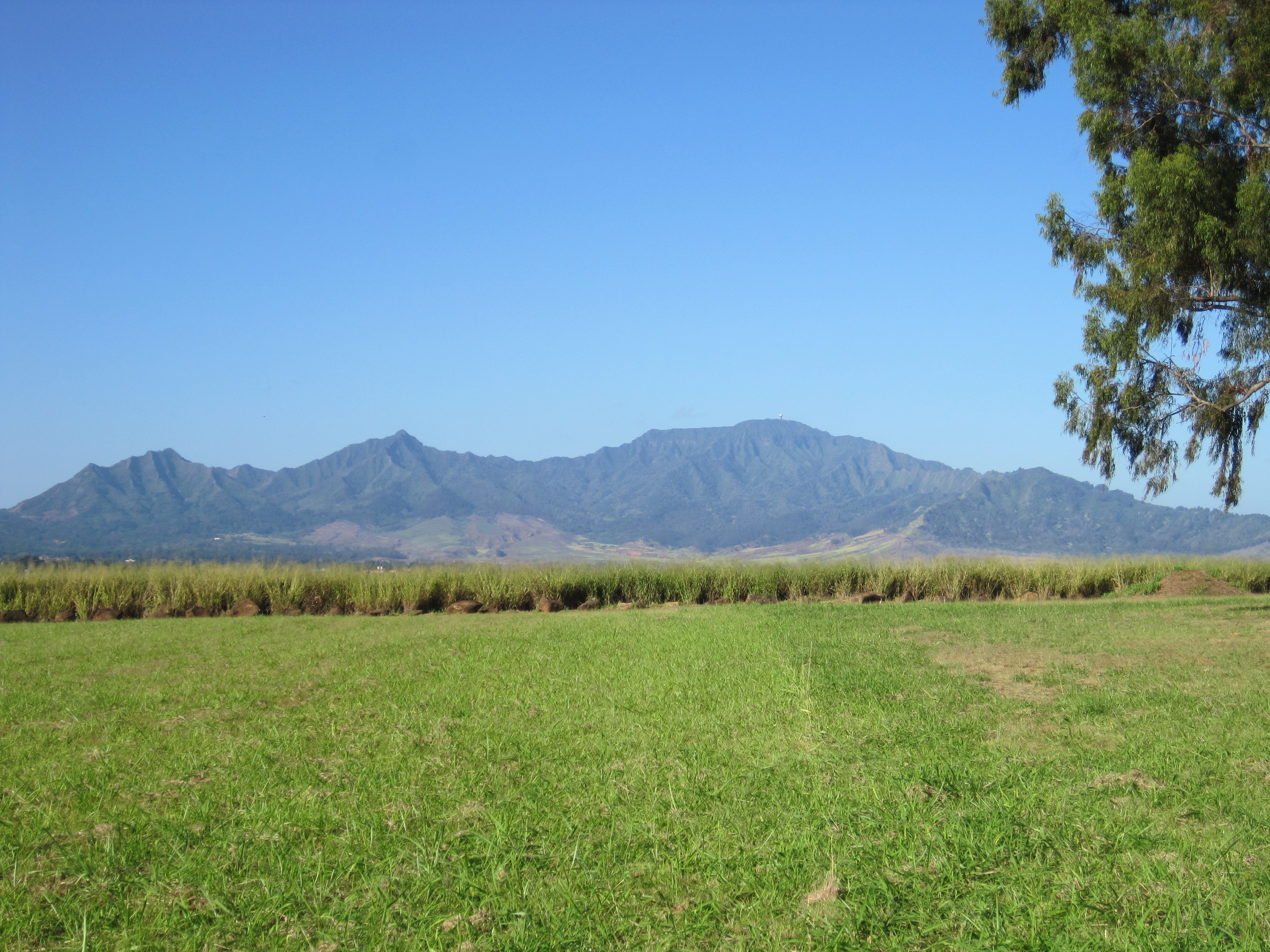
- View of the Waianae Range

Highest point
- Elevation: 4,025 ft (1,227 m)
- Prominence: 4,025 ft (1,227 m); HP of Oahu
- Coordinates: 21°30′36″N 158°9′0″W

Geography
- Location within Hawaii
- Location: Oahu, Hawaii, U.S.
- Parent range: Hawaiian Islands
- Topo map: USGS Kilohana (HI)

Geology
- Rock age: 3.9 Ma
- Mountain type: Extinct shield volcano
- Volcanic zone: Hawaiian-Emperor seamount chain
- Last eruption: 2.5 Ma

Climbing
- Easiest route: trail

Waiʻanae Range (sometimes referred to as the Waianae Mountains) is the eroded remains of an ancient shield volcano that comprises the western half of the Hawaiian Island of Oʻahu. Its crest, at Kaʻala, is the highest peak on Oʻahu at 4,025 feet (1,227 m).

Like the neighboring Koʻolau, the Waiʻanae Range is not a mountain range in the sense most people are familiar with, as the mountain range as a whole was created from a single volcano rather than plate tectonics.

The oldest lava dated from the volcano are about 3.9 million years old. About 3.2 million years ago, the volcano's activity changed, the rate of eruption started to decrease and the composition of the lava erupted from the volcano changed. The volcano is thought to have last erupted about 2.5 million years ago.

When active, the Waiʻanae volcano's center of activity was at present-day Lualualei Valley. Intense erosion on the western flank of the mountain has destroyed much of those flanks. Thus, the mountain today is much smaller than it was when the volcano was active.

While the western part of the mountain has been destroyed by erosion, the eastern part is still in a youthful stage of erosion. This is considered somewhat strange by some geologists since the western part of the volcano is on the leeward side of the island; thus, most rain falls on the eastern side of the volcano. Given this information, more erosion would be expected on the eastern portion of the mountain. One theory to explain this erosion pattern is that a large landslide cut away the western portion of the volcano. The faults from this huge landslide weakened the rock, making the western part of the mountain much more susceptible to erosion than the eastern side.
