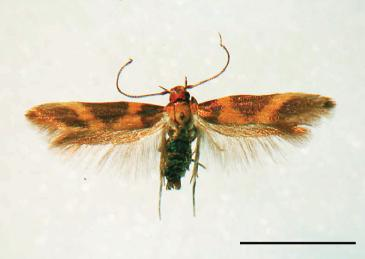

Scientific classification
- Domain: Eukaryota
- Kingdom: Animalia
- Phylum: Arthropoda
- Class: Insecta
- Order: Lepidoptera
- Family: Cosmopterigidae
- Genus: Hyposmocoma
- Species: H. inversella

Binomial name
- Hyposmocoma inversella Walsingham, 1907

= Hyposmocoma inversella =

Species of moth

Hyposmocoma inversella is a species of moth of the family Cosmopterigidae. It was first described by Lord Walsingham in 1907. It is endemic to the Hawaiian island of Oahu. The type locality is the Waianae Range, where it was collected at an elevation of 2,000 feet (610 m).

The length of the forewings is 4.9 mm for males and 4.7 mm for females. Adults have a large, orange, V-shaped marking on the forewing found in no other described species of Hyposmocoma. Adult emergence occurs between March and April. There is probably one generation per year.
