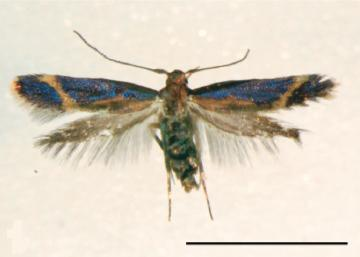

Scientific classification
- Domain: Eukaryota
- Kingdom: Animalia
- Phylum: Arthropoda
- Class: Insecta
- Order: Lepidoptera
- Family: Cosmopterigidae
- Genus: Hyposmocoma
- Species: H. auropurpurea

Binomial name
- Hyposmocoma auropurpurea Walsingham, 1907

Synonyms
- Hyposmocoma atropurpurea

= Hyposmocoma auropurpurea =

Species of moth

Hyposmocoma auropurpurea is a species of moth of the family Cosmopterigidae. It was first described by Lord Walsingham in 1907. It is endemic to the Hawaiian island of Oahu. The type locality is the Waianae Range.

The length of the forewings 4.8–5 mm for males and 5.2–5.5 mm for females. The species is unique among Hyposmocoma species because it has metallic purple wings with a narrow, diagonal orange band near the wing apex.

The larval case is dark brown, smooth, 7–9 mm in length and 1.7–2 mm wide. Case-making larvae have been collected from October to April. Larvae were found in leaf litter, but also on leaves of living plants, such as Pittosporum species.
