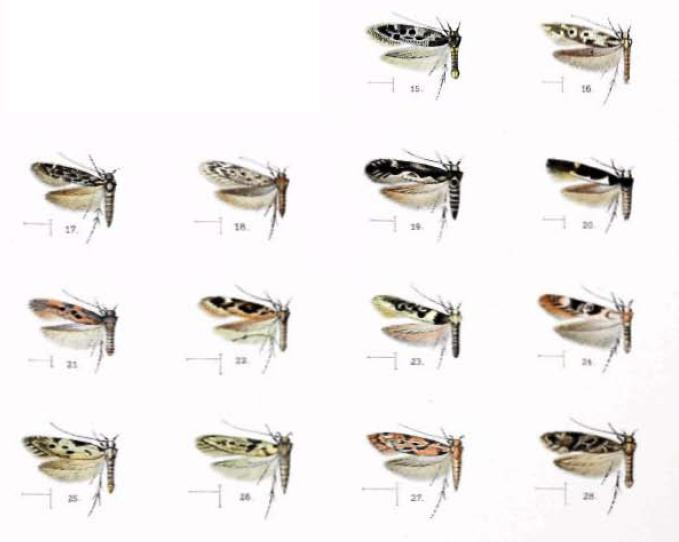
- Illustrations in Fauna Hawaiiensis: 15. Hyposmocoma liturata, 16. Hyposmocoma mimica, 17. Hyposmocoma parda, 18. Hyposmocoma lixiviella, 19. Hyposmocoma saliaris, 20. Hyposmocoma phalacra, 21. Hyposmocoma pseudolita, 22. Hyposmocoma irregularis, 23. Hyposmocoma fervida, 24. Hyposmocoma torella, 25. Hyposmocoma arenella, 26. Hyposmocoma nebulifera, 27. Hyposmocoma rubescens, 28. Hyposmocoma scolopax

Scientific classification
- Domain: Eukaryota
- Kingdom: Animalia
- Phylum: Arthropoda
- Class: Insecta
- Order: Lepidoptera
- Family: Cosmopterigidae
- Genus: Hyposmocoma
- Species: H. liturata

Binomial name
- Hyposmocoma liturata Walsingham, 1907

= Hyposmocoma liturata =

Species of moth

Hyposmocoma liturata is a species of moth of the family Cosmopterigidae. It was first described by Lord Walsingham in 1907. It is endemic to the Hawaiian islands of Oahu and Hawaii. The type locality is Kona, where it was collected at an elevation of 4,000 feet (1,200 m).

The larvae probably feed on lichen on rocks and on Pipturus. The larvae make lichen-covered cases.
