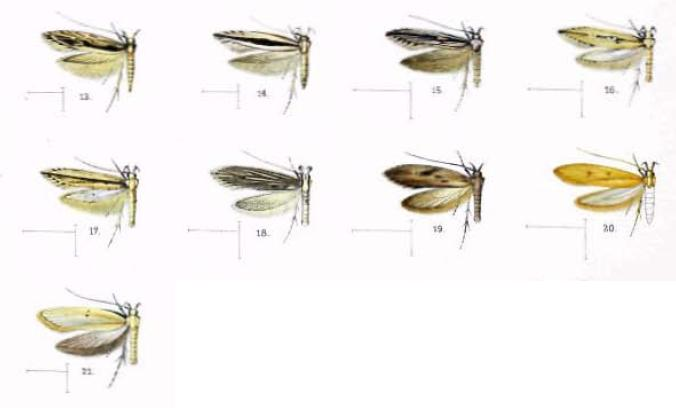
- Illustrations in Fauna Hawaiiensis: 13. Hyposmocoma fractistriata, 14. Hyposmocoma longitudinalis, 15. Hyposmocoma centralis, 16. Hyposmocoma chilonella triocellata, 17. Hyposmocoma chilonella chilonella, 18. Hyposmocoma chilonella venosa, 19. Hyposmocoma chilonella percondita, 20. Hyposmocoma epicharis, 21. Hyposmocoma subnitida

Scientific classification
- Domain: Eukaryota
- Kingdom: Animalia
- Phylum: Arthropoda
- Class: Insecta
- Order: Lepidoptera
- Family: Cosmopterigidae
- Genus: Hyposmocoma
- Species: H. chilonella

Binomial name
- Hyposmocoma chilonella Walsingham, 1907

= Hyposmocoma chilonella =

Species of moth

Hyposmocoma chilonella is a species of moth of the family Cosmopterigidae. It was first described by Lord Walsingham in 1907. It is endemic to the Hawaiian islands of Kauai, Oahu, Maui, Molokai and Hawaii.

The larvae of the nominate subspecies are whitish and feed on Acacia koa, Aleurites moluccanus, Cheirodendron gaudichaudii, Coprosma foliosa and other Coprosma species, Metrosideros, Pipturus, Rubus hawaiiensis and Smilax sandwicensis. They bore in dead wood or pith. The larvae of subspecies H. c. percondita probably feed on dead wood. Larvae of subspecies H. c. triocellata have been recorded boring in dead wood of Cheirodendron, Hibiscus, Pipturus, Pittosporum, Rubus hawaiiensis and Wikstroemia. Larvae of subspecies H. c. venosa bore in dead wood of Wikstroemia.

== Subspecies ==
- Hyposmocoma chilonella chilonella Walsingham, 1907 (Kauai, Oahu, Maui, Hawaii)
- Hyposmocoma chilonella percondita Walsingham, 1907 (Kauai, Hawaii)
- Hyposmocoma chilonella triocellata Walsingham, 1907 (Kauai, Oahu, Molokai, Hawaii)
- Hyposmocoma chilonella venosa Walsingham, 1907 (Kauai, Molokai, Hawaii)
