= Philodoria naenaeiella =

Scientific classification
- Domain: Eukaryota
- Kingdom: Animalia
- Phylum: Arthropoda
- Class: Insecta
- Order: Lepidoptera
- Family: Gracillariidae
- Genus: Philodoria
- Species: P. naenaeiella

Binomial name
- Philodoria naenaeiella (Swezey, 1940)

Synonyms
- Parectopa naenaeiella Swezey, 1940

Species of moth

Philodoria naenaeiella is a moth of the family Gracillariidae. It was first described by Otto Swezey in 1940. It is endemic to the Hawaiian island of Oahu.

The larvae feed on Dubautia laxa and Hesperomannia arborescens swezeyi. They probably mine the leaves of their host plant.
