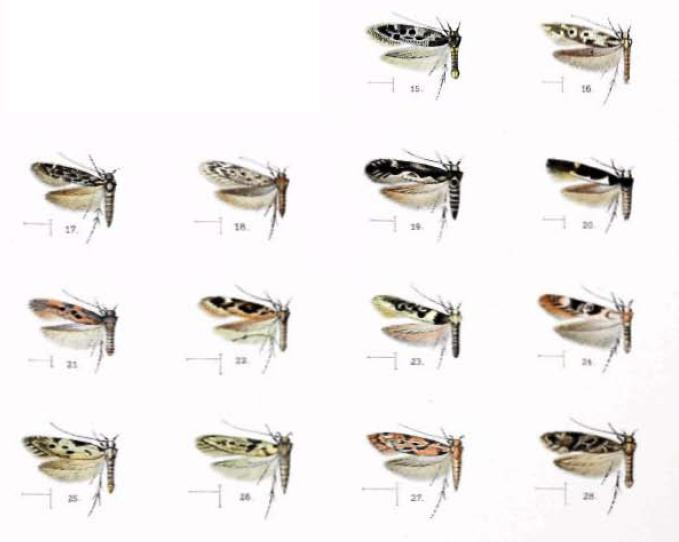
- Illustrations in Fauna Hawaiiensis: 15. Hyposmocoma liturata, 16. Hyposmocoma mimica, 17. Hyposmocoma parda, 18. Hyposmocoma lixiviella, 19. Hyposmocoma saliaris, 20. Hyposmocoma phalacra, 21. Hyposmocoma pseudolita, 22. Hyposmocoma irregularis, 23. Hyposmocoma fervida, 24. Hyposmocoma torella, 25. Hyposmocoma arenella, 26. Hyposmocoma nebulifera, 27. Hyposmocoma rubescens, 28. Hyposmocoma scolopax

Scientific classification
- Domain: Eukaryota
- Kingdom: Animalia
- Phylum: Arthropoda
- Class: Insecta
- Order: Lepidoptera
- Family: Cosmopterigidae
- Genus: Hyposmocoma
- Species: H. torella

Binomial name
- Hyposmocoma torella Walsingham, 1907

= Hyposmocoma torella =

Species of moth

Hyposmocoma torella is a species of moth of the family Cosmopterigidae. It was first described by Lord Walsingham in 1907. It is endemic to the Hawaiian island of Molokai.
