= Philodoria floscula =

Scientific classification
- Domain: Eukaryota
- Kingdom: Animalia
- Phylum: Arthropoda
- Class: Insecta
- Order: Lepidoptera
- Family: Gracillariidae
- Genus: Philodoria
- Species: P. floscula

Binomial name
- Philodoria floscula Walsingham, 1907

Species of moth

Philodoria floscula is a moth of the family Gracillariidae. It was first described by Lord Walsingham in 1907. It is endemic to the Hawaiian islands of Molokai, Maui and Hawaii.

The larvae feed on Pipturus species. They probably mine the leaves of their host plant.
