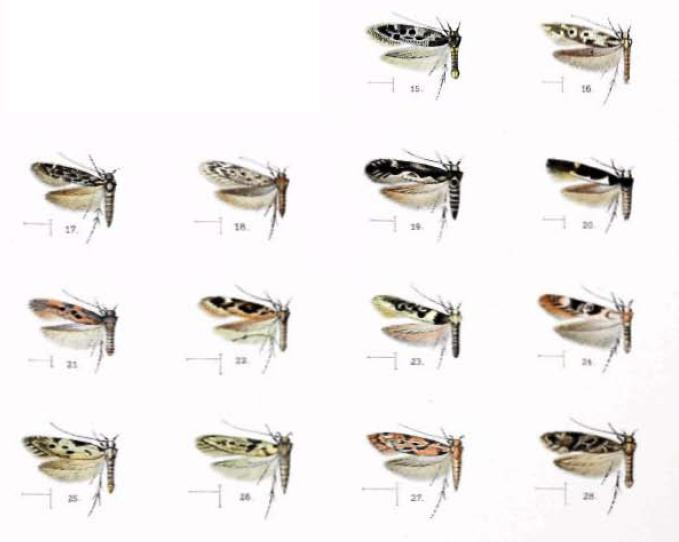
- Illustrations in Fauna Hawaiiensis: 15. Hyposmocoma liturata, 16. Hyposmocoma mimica, 17. Hyposmocoma parda, 18. Hyposmocoma lixiviella, 19. Hyposmocoma saliaris, 20. Hyposmocoma phalacra, 21. Hyposmocoma pseudolita, 22. Hyposmocoma irregularis, 23. Hyposmocoma fervida, 24. Hyposmocoma torella, 25. Hyposmocoma arenella, 26. Hyposmocoma nebulifera, 27. Hyposmocoma rubescens, 28. Hyposmocoma scolopax

Scientific classification
- Domain: Eukaryota
- Kingdom: Animalia
- Phylum: Arthropoda
- Class: Insecta
- Order: Lepidoptera
- Family: Cosmopterigidae
- Genus: Hyposmocoma
- Species: H. arenella

Binomial name
- Hyposmocoma arenella Walsingham, 1907

= Hyposmocoma arenella =

Species of moth

Hyposmocoma arenella is a species of moth of the family Cosmopterigidae. It was first described by Lord Walsingham in 1907. It is endemic to the island of Hawaii. The type locality is Kona, where it was collected at an elevation of 2,000 feet (610 m).
