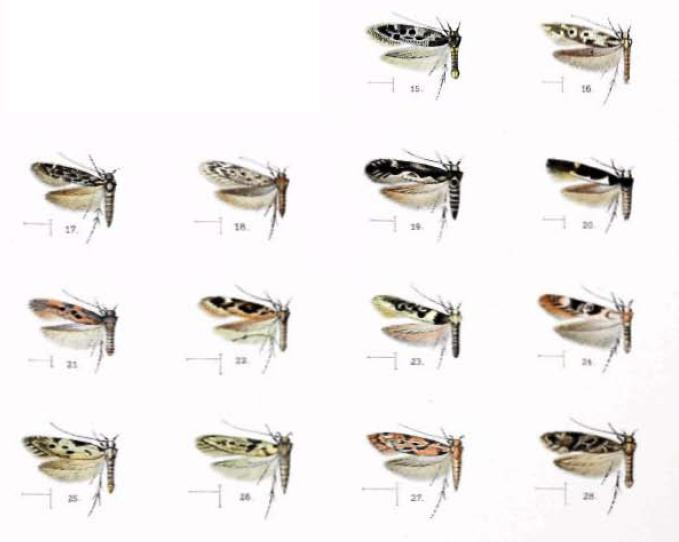
- Illustrations in Fauna Hawaiiensis: 15. Hyposmocoma liturata, 16. Hyposmocoma mimica, 17. Hyposmocoma parda, 18. Hyposmocoma lixiviella, 19. Hyposmocoma saliaris, 20. Hyposmocoma phalacra, 21. Hyposmocoma pseudolita, 22. Hyposmocoma irregularis, 23. Hyposmocoma fervida, 24. Hyposmocoma torella, 25. Hyposmocoma arenella, 26. Hyposmocoma nebulifera, 27. Hyposmocoma rubescens, 28. Hyposmocoma scolopax

Scientific classification
- Domain: Eukaryota
- Kingdom: Animalia
- Phylum: Arthropoda
- Class: Insecta
- Order: Lepidoptera
- Family: Cosmopterigidae
- Genus: Hyposmocoma
- Species: H. rubescens

Binomial name
- Hyposmocoma rubescens Walsingham, 1907

= Hyposmocoma rubescens =

Species of moth

Hyposmocoma rubescens is a species of moth of the family Cosmopterigidae. It was first described by Lord Walsingham in 1907. It is endemic to the Hawaiian island of Kauai.
