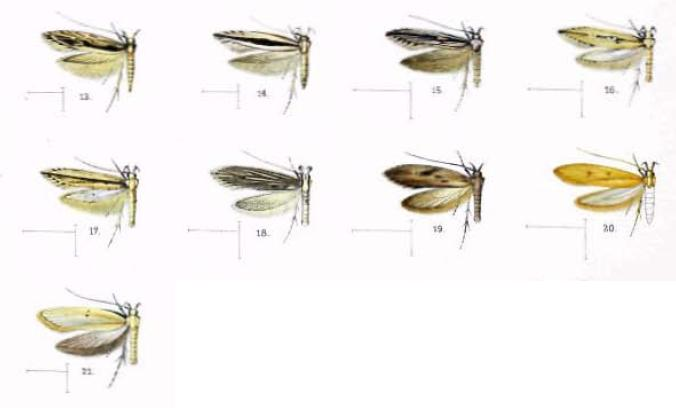
- Illustrations in Fauna Hawaiiensis: 13. Hyposmocoma fractistriata, 14. Hyposmocoma longitudinalis, 15. Hyposmocoma centralis, 16. Hyposmocoma chilonella triocellata, 17. Hyposmocoma chilonella chilonella, 18. Hyposmocoma chilonella venosa, 19. Hyposmocoma chilonella percondita, 20. Hyposmocoma epicharis, 21. Hyposmocoma subnitida

Scientific classification
- Domain: Eukaryota
- Kingdom: Animalia
- Phylum: Arthropoda
- Class: Insecta
- Order: Lepidoptera
- Family: Cosmopterigidae
- Genus: Hyposmocoma
- Species: H. longitudinalis

Binomial name
- Hyposmocoma longitudinalis Walsingham, 1907

= Hyposmocoma longitudinalis =

Species of moth

Hyposmocoma longitudinalis is a species of moth of the family Cosmopterigidae. It was first described by Lord Walsingham in 1907. It is endemic to the island of Hawaii.
