= Philodoria costalis =

Scientific classification
- Domain: Eukaryota
- Kingdom: Animalia
- Phylum: Arthropoda
- Class: Insecta
- Order: Lepidoptera
- Family: Gracillariidae
- Genus: Philodoria
- Species: P. costalis

Binomial name
- Philodoria costalis Swezey, 1934

Species of moth

Philodoria costalis is a moth of the family Gracillariidae. It was first described by Otto Herman Swezey in 1934. It is endemic to the Hawaiian island of Oahu.

The larvae feed on Pipturus species. They mine the leaves of their host plant. The larvae emerge from the mine to form an oval brown cocoon on the surface of the leaves.
