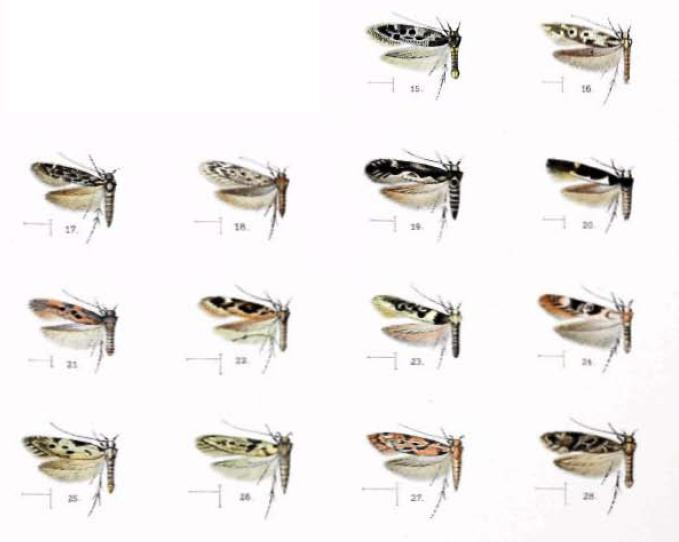
- Illustrations in Fauna Hawaiiensis: 15. Hyposmocoma liturata, 16. Hyposmocoma mimica, 17. Hyposmocoma parda, 18. Hyposmocoma lixiviella, 19. Hyposmocoma saliaris, 20. Hyposmocoma phalacra, 21. Hyposmocoma pseudolita, 22. Hyposmocoma irregularis, 23. Hyposmocoma fervida, 24. Hyposmocoma torella, 25. Hyposmocoma arenella, 26. Hyposmocoma nebulifera, 27. Hyposmocoma rubescens, 28. Hyposmocoma scolopax

Scientific classification
- Kingdom: Animalia
- Phylum: Arthropoda
- Clade: Pancrustacea
- Class: Insecta
- Order: Lepidoptera
- Family: Cosmopterigidae
- Genus: Hyposmocoma
- Species: H. parda

Binomial name
- Hyposmocoma parda (Butler, 1881)

Synonyms
- Laverna parda Butler, 1881

= Hyposmocoma parda =

Species of moth

Hyposmocoma parda is a species of moth of the family Cosmopterigidae. It was first described by Arthur Gardiner Butler in 1881. It is endemic to the Hawaiian islands of Maui and Hawaii. The type locality is Haleakalā, where it was collected at an elevation of 4,000 feet (1,200 m).

The food plant is unknown, but it is thought to feed on dead wood.
