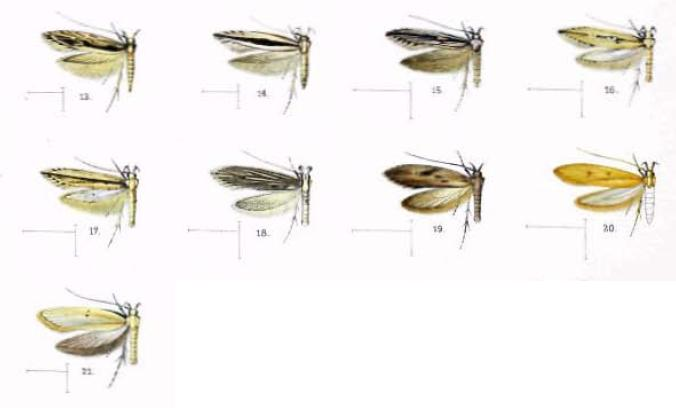
- Illustrations in Fauna Hawaiiensis: 13. Hyposmocoma fractistriata, 14. Hyposmocoma longitudinalis, 15. Hyposmocoma centralis, 16. Hyposmocoma chilonella triocellata, 17. Hyposmocoma chilonella chilonella, 18. Hyposmocoma chilonella venosa, 19. Hyposmocoma chilonella percondita, 20. Hyposmocoma epicharis, 21. Hyposmocoma subnitida

Scientific classification
- Domain: Eukaryota
- Kingdom: Animalia
- Phylum: Arthropoda
- Class: Insecta
- Order: Lepidoptera
- Family: Cosmopterigidae
- Genus: Hyposmocoma
- Species: H. centralis

Binomial name
- Hyposmocoma centralis Walsingham, 1907

= Hyposmocoma centralis =

Species of moth

Hyposmocoma centralis is a species of moth of the family Cosmopterigidae. It was first described by Lord Walsingham in 1907. It is endemic to the Hawaiian island of Kauai. The type locality is Lihue, where it was collected at an elevation of 4,000 feet (1,200 m).
