= Philodoria pipturiana =

Scientific classification
- Domain: Eukaryota
- Kingdom: Animalia
- Phylum: Arthropoda
- Class: Insecta
- Order: Lepidoptera
- Family: Gracillariidae
- Genus: Philodoria
- Species: P. pipturiana

Binomial name
- Philodoria pipturiana Swezey, 1923

Species of moth

Philodoria pipturiana is a moth of the family Gracillariidae. It was first described by Otto Herman Swezey in 1923. It is endemic to the island of Hawaii.

The larvae feed on Pipturus species. They probably mine the leaves of their host plant.
