= Philodoria pipturicola =

Scientific classification
- Domain: Eukaryota
- Kingdom: Animalia
- Phylum: Arthropoda
- Class: Insecta
- Order: Lepidoptera
- Family: Gracillariidae
- Genus: Philodoria
- Species: P. pipturicola

Binomial name
- Philodoria pipturicola Swezey, 1915

Species of moth

Philodoria pipturicola is a moth of the family Gracillariidae. It was first described by Otto Swezey in 1915. It is endemic to the Hawaiian islands of Oahu and Maui.

The larvae feed on Pipturus species. They mine the leaves of their host plant.
