= Philodoria micropetala =

Scientific classification
- Domain: Eukaryota
- Kingdom: Animalia
- Phylum: Arthropoda
- Class: Insecta
- Order: Lepidoptera
- Family: Gracillariidae
- Genus: Philodoria
- Species: P. micropetala

Binomial name
- Philodoria micropetala Walsingham, 1907

Species of moth

Philodoria micropetala is a moth of the family Gracillariidae. It was first described by Lord Walsingham in 1907. It is endemic to the Hawaiian island of Kauai.

The larvae feed on Pipturus species. They probably mine the leaves of their host plant.
