= Philodoria marginestrigata =

Scientific classification
- Domain: Eukaryota
- Kingdom: Animalia
- Phylum: Arthropoda
- Class: Insecta
- Order: Lepidoptera
- Family: Gracillariidae
- Genus: Philodoria
- Species: P. marginestrigata

Binomial name
- Philodoria marginestrigata (Walsingham, 1907)

Synonyms
- Gracilaria marginestrigata Walsingham, 1907; Parectopa marginestrigata

Species of moth

Philodoria marginestrigata, the ilima leaf miner, is a moth of the family Gracillariidae. It was first described by Lord Walsingham in 1907. It is endemic to the Hawaiian islands of Nīhoa, Kauaʻi, Oʻahu, Molokaʻi and Hawaiʻi.

The larvae feed on Dubautia species, Xanthium echinatum, Xanthium strumarium, Abutilon species (including Abutilon grandifolium, Abutilon incanum and Abutilon molle), Sida species (Sida cordifolia, Sida fallax, Sida meyeniana and Sida rhombifolia) and Datura species. They mine the leaves of their host plant.
