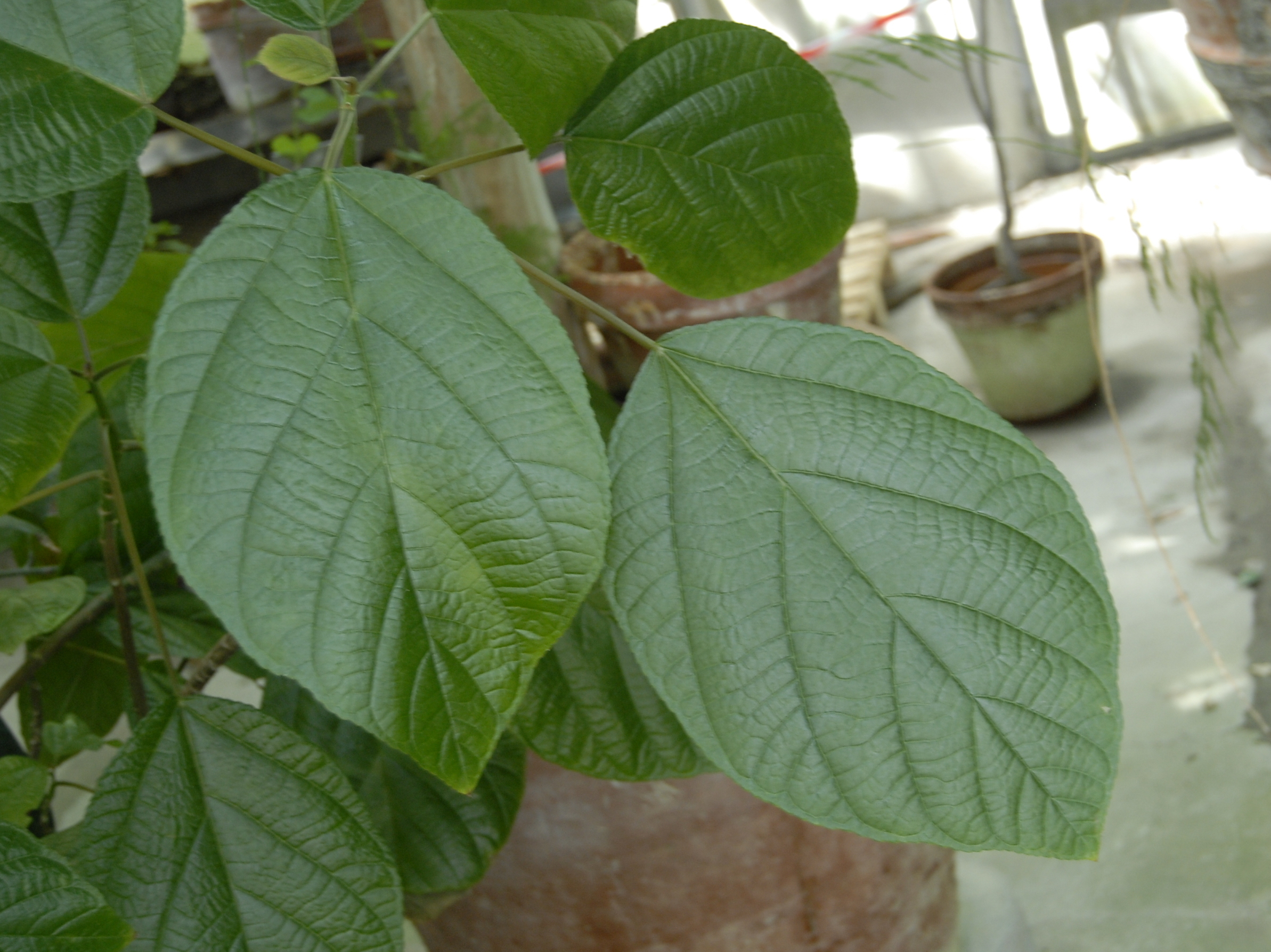
- Pipturus platyphyllus at Orto Botanico dell'Università di Genova

Scientific classification
- Kingdom: Plantae
- Clade: Tracheophytes
- Clade: Angiosperms
- Clade: Eudicots
- Clade: Rosids
- Order: Rosales
- Family: Urticaceae
- Genus: Pipturus
- Species: P. platyphyllus

Binomial name
- Pipturus platyphyllus Wedd.

Synonyms
- Perlarius platyphyllus (Wedd.) Kuntze

= Pipturus platyphyllus =

Species of flowering plant

Pipturus platyphyllus is a species of plant in the family Urticaceae.

== Distribution ==
This species is endemic to Fiji.
