= Philodoria hibiscella =

Scientific classification
- Domain: Eukaryota
- Kingdom: Animalia
- Phylum: Arthropoda
- Class: Insecta
- Order: Lepidoptera
- Family: Gracillariidae
- Genus: Philodoria
- Species: P. hibiscella

Binomial name
- Philodoria hibiscella (Swezey, 1913)

Synonyms
- Gracilaria hibiscella Swezey, 1913; Parectopa hibiscella

Species of moth

Philodoria hibiscella, the hibiscus leaf miner, is a moth of the family Gracillariidae. It was first described by Otto Swezey in 1913. It is endemic to the Hawaiian islands of Oahu and Hawaii.

The larvae feed on Hibiscus arnottianus and Hibiscus rosa-sinensis. They mine the leaves of their host plant.
