= Philodoria ureraella =

Scientific classification
- Domain: Eukaryota
- Kingdom: Animalia
- Phylum: Arthropoda
- Class: Insecta
- Order: Lepidoptera
- Family: Gracillariidae
- Genus: Philodoria
- Species: P. ureraella

Binomial name
- Philodoria ureraella (Swezey, 1915)

Synonyms
- Gracilaria ureraella Swezey, 1915; Parectopa ureraella

Species of moth

Philodoria ureraella is a moth of the family Gracillariidae. It was first described by Otto Swezey in 1915. It is endemic to the Hawaiian island of Oahu.

The larvae feed on Urera sandwicensis and Urera kaalae.
