= Hesperomannia arbuscula =

Conservation status
- Critically Endangered (IUCN 3.1)

- Critically Imperiled (NatureServe)

Scientific classification
- Kingdom: Plantae
- Clade: Tracheophytes
- Clade: Angiosperms
- Clade: Eudicots
- Clade: Asterids
- Order: Asterales
- Family: Asteraceae
- Genus: Hesperomannia
- Species: H. arbuscula

Binomial name
- Hesperomannia arbuscula Hillebr.

Species of flowering plant

Hesperomannia arbuscula, the Maui island-aster or Maui hesperomannia, is a species of flowering plant in the family Asteraceae that is endemic to the island of Maui in Hawaiʻi; plants from Oʻahu are now classified as Hesperomannia oahuensis. It is found in mixed mesic and wet forests at elevations of 350–900 m (1,150–2,950 ft). It is threatened by habitat degradation caused by feral pigs, competition with alien plants, predation from rats, and trampling or collecting by humans.

There are fewer than 25 plants remaining in the wild.
