= Philodoria touchardiella =

Scientific classification
- Domain: Eukaryota
- Kingdom: Animalia
- Phylum: Arthropoda
- Class: Insecta
- Order: Lepidoptera
- Family: Gracillariidae
- Genus: Philodoria
- Species: P. touchardiella

Binomial name
- Philodoria touchardiella (Swezey, 1928)

Synonyms
- Parectopa touchardiella Swezey, 1928

Species of moth

Philodoria touchardiella is a moth of the family Gracillariidae. It was first described by Otto Herman Swezey in 1928. It is endemic to the Hawaiian island of Maui.

The larvae feed on Touchardia latifolia. They probably mine the leaves of their host plant.
