= Philodoria pipturiella =

Scientific classification
- Domain: Eukaryota
- Kingdom: Animalia
- Phylum: Arthropoda
- Class: Insecta
- Order: Lepidoptera
- Family: Gracillariidae
- Genus: Philodoria
- Species: P. pipturiella

Binomial name
- Philodoria pipturiella Swezey, 1923

Species of moth

Philodoria pipturiella is a moth of the family Gracillariidae. It was first described by Otto Herman Swezey in 1923. It is endemic to the Hawaiian island of Oahu.
