= Pipturus schaeferi =

Conservation status
- Vulnerable (IUCN 2.3)

Scientific classification
- Kingdom: Plantae
- Clade: Tracheophytes
- Clade: Angiosperms
- Clade: Eudicots
- Clade: Rosids
- Order: Rosales
- Family: Urticaceae
- Genus: Pipturus
- Species: P. schaeferi

Binomial name
- Pipturus schaeferi J.Florence (1996)

Species of flowering plant

Pipturus schaeferi is a species of plant in the family Urticaceae. It is endemic to the Marquesas Islands of French Polynesia.
