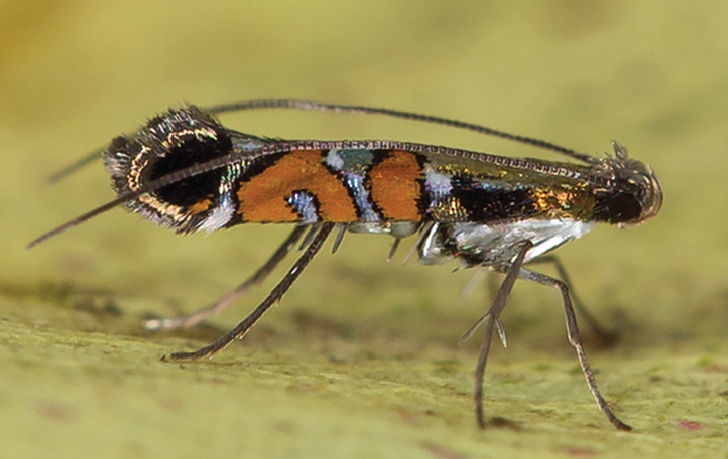

Scientific classification
- Domain: Eukaryota
- Kingdom: Animalia
- Phylum: Arthropoda
- Class: Insecta
- Order: Lepidoptera
- Family: Gracillariidae
- Genus: Philodoria
- Species: P. succedanea

Binomial name
- Philodoria succedanea Walsingham, 1907

= Philodoria succedanea =

Species of moth

Philodoria succedanea is a moth of the family Gracillariidae. It was first described by Lord Walsingham in 1907. It is endemic to the Hawaiian islands of Maui and Hawaii.

The larvae feed on Myrsine species. They probably mine the leaves of their host plant.
