= Philodoria wilkesiella =

Scientific classification
- Domain: Eukaryota
- Kingdom: Animalia
- Phylum: Arthropoda
- Class: Insecta
- Order: Lepidoptera
- Family: Gracillariidae
- Genus: Philodoria
- Species: P. wilkesiella

Binomial name
- Philodoria wilkesiella Swezey, 1940

Species of moth

Philodoria wilkesiella is a moth of the family Gracillariidae. It was first described by Otto Swezey in 1940. It is endemic to the Hawaiian island of Maui.

Adults have a distinctive color pattern.

The larvae feed on Argyroxiphium grayana. They probably mine the leaves of their host plant.
