= Philodoria hauicola =

Scientific classification
- Domain: Eukaryota
- Kingdom: Animalia
- Phylum: Arthropoda
- Class: Insecta
- Order: Lepidoptera
- Family: Gracillariidae
- Genus: Philodoria
- Species: P. hauicola

Binomial name
- Philodoria hauicola (Swezey, 1910)

Synonyms
- Gracilaria hauicola Swezey, 1910; Parectopa hauicola

Species of moth

Philodoria hauicola, the hau leaf miner, is a moth of the family Gracillariidae. It was first described by Otto Herman Swezey in 1910. It is endemic to the Hawaiian islands of Kauai, Oahu, Maui and Hawaii.

The larvae feed on Hibiscus tiliaceus. They mine the leaves of their host plant.
