= Philodoria dubauticola =

Scientific classification
- Domain: Eukaryota
- Kingdom: Animalia
- Phylum: Arthropoda
- Class: Insecta
- Order: Lepidoptera
- Family: Gracillariidae
- Genus: Philodoria
- Species: P. dubauticola

Binomial name
- Philodoria dubauticola (Swezey, 1940)

Synonyms
- Parectopa dubauticola Swezey, 1940

Species of moth

Philodoria dubauticola is a moth of the family Gracillariidae. It was first described by Otto Swezey in 1940. It is only known from the Hawaiian island of Maui.

The larvae feed on Dubautia plantaginea. They probably mine the leaves of their host plant.
