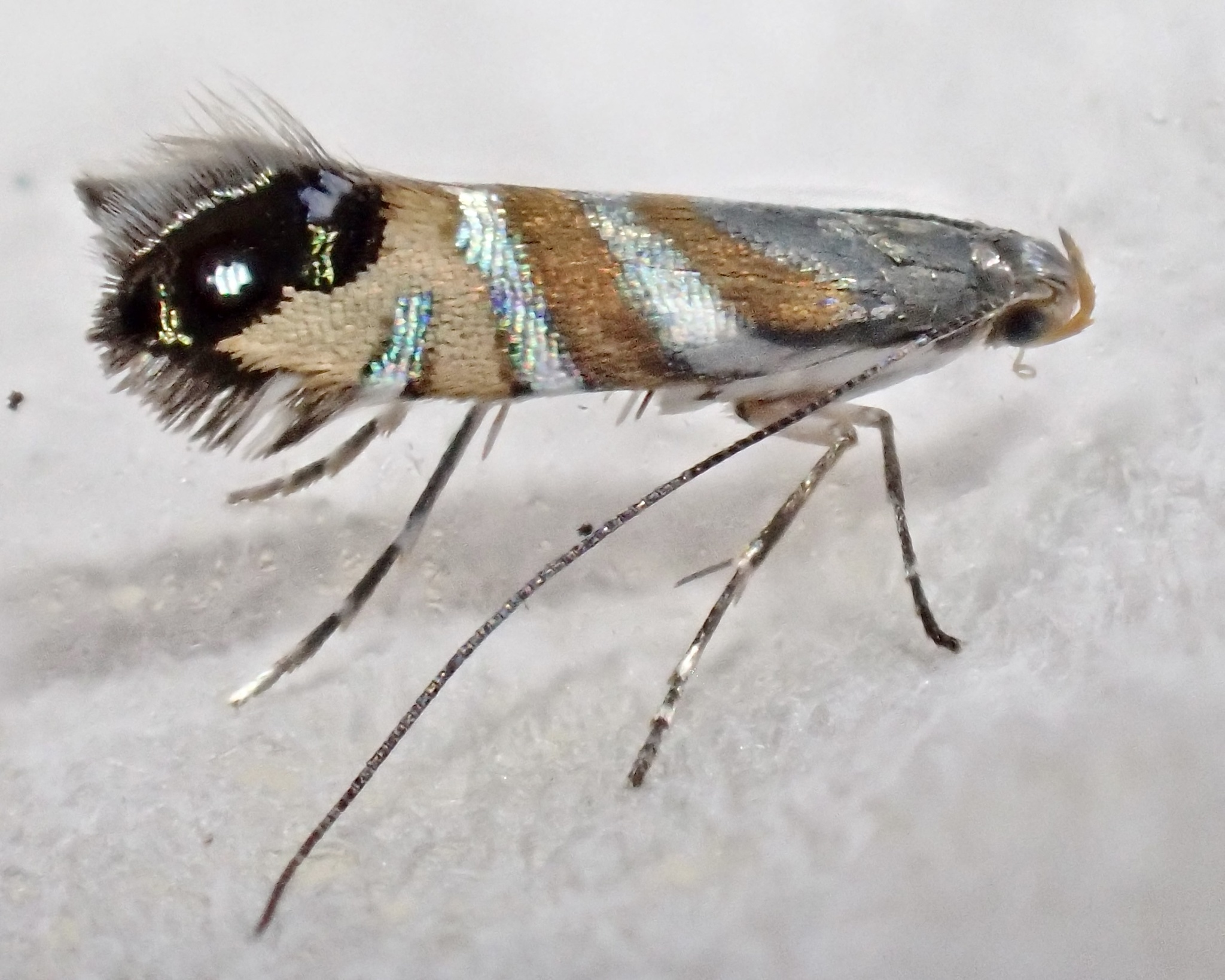
- Adult
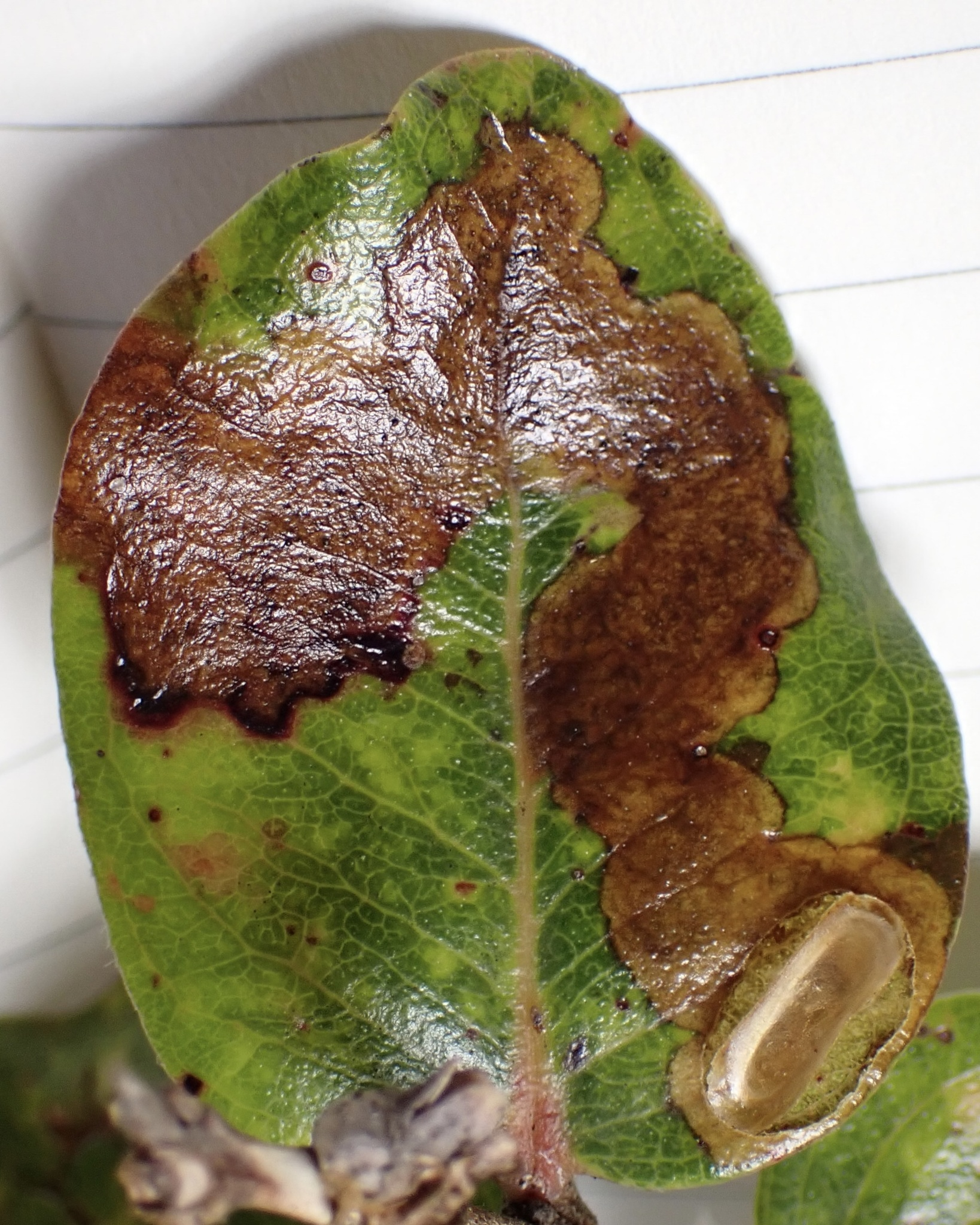
- Leaf mine on Metrosideros polymorpha

Scientific classification
- Domain: Eukaryota
- Kingdom: Animalia
- Phylum: Arthropoda
- Class: Insecta
- Order: Lepidoptera
- Family: Gracillariidae
- Genus: Philodoria
- Species: P. splendida

Binomial name
- Philodoria splendida Walsingham, 1907

= Philodoria splendida =

Species of moth

Philodoria splendida is a moth of the family Gracillariidae. It was first described by Lord Walsingham in 1907. It is endemic to the Hawaiian islands of Kauai, Oahu, Molokai, Lanai and Hawaii.

The larvae feed on Metrosideros species, including M. polymorpha. They mine the leaves of their host plant.

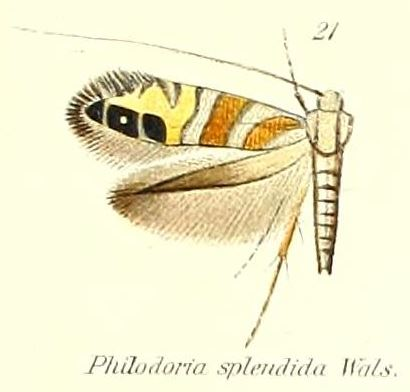
Illustration
