= Philodoria epibathra =

Scientific classification
- Domain: Eukaryota
- Kingdom: Animalia
- Phylum: Arthropoda
- Class: Insecta
- Order: Lepidoptera
- Family: Gracillariidae
- Genus: Philodoria
- Species: P. epibathra

Binomial name
- Philodoria epibathra (Walsingham, 1907)

Synonyms
- Gracilaria epibathra Walsingham, 1907; Parectopa epibathra

Species of moth

Philodoria epibathra is a moth of the family Gracillariidae. It was first described by Lord Walsingham in 1907. It is endemic to the Hawaiian island of Molokai.

They probably mine the leaves of their host plant.
