= Philodoria dubautiella =

Scientific classification
- Domain: Eukaryota
- Kingdom: Animalia
- Phylum: Arthropoda
- Class: Insecta
- Order: Lepidoptera
- Family: Gracillariidae
- Genus: Philodoria
- Species: P. dubautiella

Binomial name
- Philodoria dubautiella (Swezey, 1913)

Synonyms
- Gracilaria dubautiella Swezey, 1913; Parectopa dubautiella

Species of moth

Philodoria dubautiella is a moth of the family Gracillariidae. It was first described by Otto Swezey in 1913. It is endemic to the Hawaiian island of Oahu.

The larvae feed on Dubautia plantaginea. They mine the leaves of their host plant.
