= Philodoria sciallactis =

Scientific classification
- Kingdom: Animalia
- Phylum: Arthropoda
- Class: Insecta
- Order: Lepidoptera
- Family: Gracillariidae
- Genus: Philodoria
- Species: P. sciallactis

Binomial name
- Philodoria sciallactis (Meyrick, 1928)

Synonyms
- Parectopa sciallactis Meyrick, 1928

Species of moth

Philodoria sciallactis is a moth of the family Gracillariidae. It was first described by Edward Meyrick in 1928. It is endemic to the Hawaiian island of Oahu.

The larvae feed on Lipochaeta integrifolia. They probably mine the leaves of their host plant.
