= Philodoria nigrella =

Scientific classification
- Domain: Eukaryota
- Kingdom: Animalia
- Phylum: Arthropoda
- Class: Insecta
- Order: Lepidoptera
- Family: Gracillariidae
- Genus: Philodoria
- Species: P. nigrella

Binomial name
- Philodoria nigrella Walsingham, 1907

Species of moth

Philodoria nigrella is a moth of the family Gracillariidae. It was first described by Lord Walsingham in 1907. It is endemic to the island of Hawaii.

The larvae probably mine the leaves of their host plant like other members of the Philodoria genus.
