= Philodoria urerana =

Scientific classification
- Domain: Eukaryota
- Kingdom: Animalia
- Phylum: Arthropoda
- Class: Insecta
- Order: Lepidoptera
- Family: Gracillariidae
- Genus: Philodoria
- Species: P. urerana

Binomial name
- Philodoria urerana (Swezey, 1915)

Synonyms
- Gracilaria urerana Swezey, 1915; Parectopa urerana

Species of moth

Philodoria urerana is a moth of the family Gracillariidae. It was first described by Otto Swezey in 1915. It is endemic to the Hawaiian islands of Oahu and Hawaii.

The larvae feed on Urera sandwicensis. They mine the leaves of their host plant.

The pupal period lasts about 10 days.
