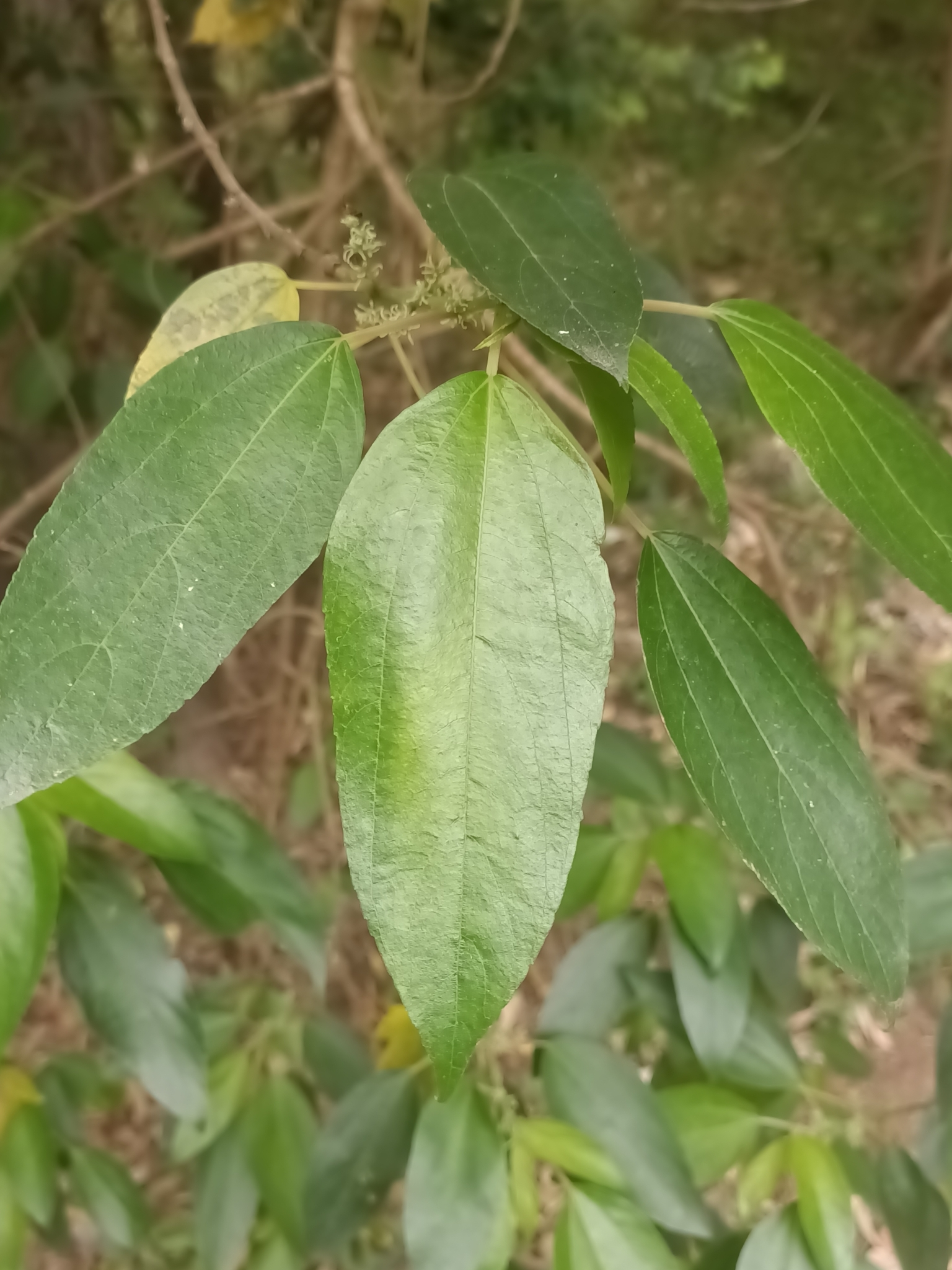

Conservation status
- Least Concern (IUCN 3.1)

Scientific classification
- Kingdom: Plantae
- Clade: Tracheophytes
- Clade: Angiosperms
- Clade: Eudicots
- Clade: Rosids
- Order: Rosales
- Family: Urticaceae
- Genus: Pipturus
- Species: P. argenteus

Binomial name
- Pipturus argenteus Wedd.

= Pipturus argenteus =

Species of shrub in the nettle family

Pipturus argenteus, known as false stinger, native mulberry, white mulberry, white nettle, amahatyan (Chamorro), and ghasooso (Carolinian), is a small tree native to tropical Asia, northern and eastern Australia and the Pacific.

Unlike many members of its family, this species does not sting.

== Taxonomy ==
The specific epithet is derived from the Latin word argenteus, meaning "silvery" and refers to the silvery hairs found on the ventral surface of the leaves. The species is known by a variety of names across its large range, including false stinger, white nettle, and native mulberry in Australia, pulus scrobbo on Christmas Island, soga in Samoa, and fau on Tokelau.

== Distribution and habitat ==
Pipturus argenteus is a widely distributed species with a range that stretches from Indonesia through Melanesia and Micronesia into Polynesia, as far west as the islands of French Polynesia. It is generally a plant of the rainforest, where it is partial to recolonising cleared areas by forming thickets. It can also be found in wet sclerophyll forests and woodlands.

== Conservation ==
A common species across its large range, Pipturus argenteus is considered to be of least concern by the IUCN Red List.

== Relationship with humans ==
It has been used traditionally for medicine and for making rope. Rope made out of the bark fibres of Pipturus argenteus was used for cordage, fishing, and tying off the navels of babies. The fruit of this plant are also edible and are occasionally consumed in Polynesia.
