= Philodoria basalis =

Scientific classification
- Domain: Eukaryota
- Kingdom: Animalia
- Phylum: Arthropoda
- Class: Insecta
- Order: Lepidoptera
- Family: Gracillariidae
- Genus: Philodoria
- Species: P. basalis

Binomial name
- Philodoria basalis Walsingham, 1907

Species of moth

Philodoria basalis is a moth of the family Gracillariidae. It was first described by Lord Walsingham in 1907. It is endemic to the Hawaiian islands of Maui and Hawaii.

The larvae feed on Metrosideros species. They mine the leaves of their host plant.
