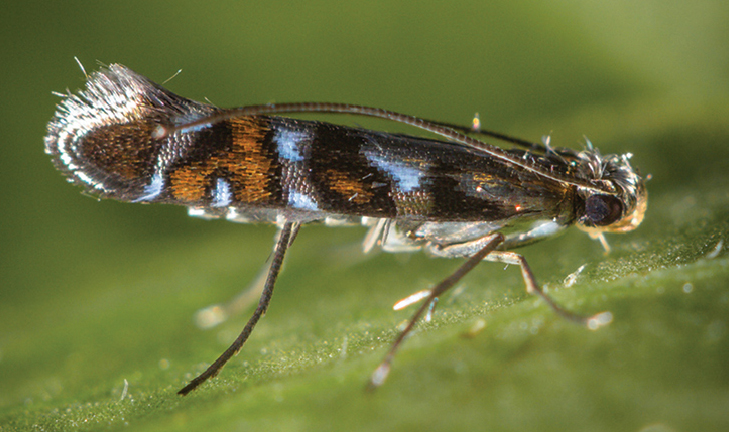
- Resting posture of adult Philodoria auromagnifica

Scientific classification
- Domain: Eukaryota
- Kingdom: Animalia
- Phylum: Arthropoda
- Class: Insecta
- Order: Lepidoptera
- Family: Gracillariidae
- Genus: Philodoria
- Species: P. auromagnifica

Binomial name
- Philodoria auromagnifica Walsingham, 1907

= Philodoria auromagnifica =

Species of moth

Philodoria auromagnifica is a moth of the family Gracillariidae. It was first described by Lord Walsingham in 1907. It is endemic to the Hawaiian islands of Oahu, Molokai and Hawaii.

The larvae feed on Myrsine species. They mine the leaves of their host plant.
