= Philodoria nigrelloides =

Scientific classification
- Kingdom: Animalia
- Phylum: Arthropoda
- Class: Insecta
- Order: Lepidoptera
- Family: Gracillariidae
- Genus: Philodoria
- Species: P. nigrelloides

Binomial name
- Philodoria nigrelloides (Swezey, 1946)

Synonyms
- Parectopa nigrelloides Swezey, 1946

Species of moth

Philodoria nigrelloides is a moth of the family Gracillariidae. It was first described by Otto Swezey in 1946. It is endemic to the Hawaiian island of Kauai.

The larvae feed on Dubautia species. They mine the leaves of their host plant.
