= Philodoria lysimachiella =

Scientific classification
- Domain: Eukaryota
- Kingdom: Animalia
- Phylum: Arthropoda
- Class: Insecta
- Order: Lepidoptera
- Family: Gracillariidae
- Genus: Philodoria
- Species: P. lysimachiella

Binomial name
- Philodoria lysimachiella Swezey, 1928

Species of moth

Philodoria lysimachiella is a moth of the family Gracillariidae. It was first described by Otto Herman Swezey in 1928. It is endemic to the Hawaiian island of Oahu.

The larvae feed on Lysimachia rotundifolia. They probably mine the leaves of their host plant.
