= Hesperomannia lydgatei =

Conservation status
- Critically Endangered (IUCN 3.1)

Scientific classification
- Kingdom: Plantae
- Clade: Tracheophytes
- Clade: Angiosperms
- Clade: Eudicots
- Clade: Asterids
- Order: Asterales
- Family: Asteraceae
- Genus: Hesperomannia
- Species: H. lydgatei

Binomial name
- Hesperomannia lydgatei Forbes

Species of flowering plant

Hesperomannia lydgatei, the Kauaʻi island-aster or Kauaʻi hesperomannia, is a rare species of flowering plant in the family Asteraceae.

It is found only in Hawaii, where it is endemic to Kauaʻi.

It is threatened by habitat loss. There are fewer than 300 individuals remaining.
