= Philodoria spilota =

Scientific classification
- Domain: Eukaryota
- Kingdom: Animalia
- Phylum: Arthropoda
- Class: Insecta
- Order: Lepidoptera
- Family: Gracillariidae
- Genus: Philodoria
- Species: P. spilota

Binomial name
- Philodoria spilota (Walsingham, 1907)

Synonyms
- Elachista spilota Walsingham, 1907

Species of moth

Philodoria spilota is a moth of the family Gracillariidae. It was first described by Lord Walsingham in 1907. It is endemic to the Hawaiian island of Maui.

They probably mine the leaves of their host plant.
