= Hesperomannia =

Scientific classification
- Kingdom: Plantae
- Clade: Embryophytes
- Clade: Tracheophytes
- Clade: Spermatophytes
- Clade: Angiosperms
- Clade: Eudicots
- Clade: Asterids
- Order: Asterales
- Family: Asteraceae
- Subfamily: Vernonioideae
- Tribe: Vernonieae
- Genus: Hesperomannia; A.Gray

Genus of flowering plants

Hesperomannia (island-aster) is a genus of flowering plant in the family Asteraceae.

Hesperomannia is endemic to Hawaii and consists of four species:

- Hesperomannia arborescens A.Gray – Lanai hesperomannia
- Hesperomannia arbuscula Hillebr. – Maui hesperomannia
- Hesperomannia lydgatei C.N.Forbes – Kauai hesperomannia
- Hesperomannia oahuensis (Hillebr.) O.Deg.
- Hesperomannia swezeyi O.Deg.

Although traditionally classified in the tribe Mutisieae, molecular evidence shows that it belongs in the tribe Vernonieae, most closely related to the African Vernonia species.
