= Philodoria pittosporella =

Scientific classification
- Domain: Eukaryota
- Kingdom: Animalia
- Phylum: Arthropoda
- Class: Insecta
- Order: Lepidoptera
- Family: Gracillariidae
- Genus: Philodoria
- Species: P. pittosporella

Binomial name
- Philodoria pittosporella (Swezey, 1928)

Synonyms
- Parectopa pittosporella Swezey, 1928

Species of moth

Philodoria pittosporella is a moth of the family Gracillariidae. It was first described by Otto Herman Swezey in 1928. It is endemic to the Hawaiian island of Oahu.

The larvae feed on Pittosporum species. They mine the leaves of their host plant. The larva emerges from the mine to spin a cocoon on the leaf surface.
