= Philodoria lipochaetaella =

Scientific classification
- Kingdom: Animalia
- Phylum: Arthropoda
- Class: Insecta
- Order: Lepidoptera
- Family: Gracillariidae
- Genus: Philodoria
- Species: P. lipochaetaella

Binomial name
- Philodoria lipochaetaella (Swezey, 1940)

Synonyms
- Parectopa lipochaetaella Swezey, 1940; Parectopa lipochaetae Swezey, 1946

Species of moth

Philodoria lipochaetaella is a moth of the family Gracillariidae. It was first described by Otto Swezey in 1940. It is endemic to the Hawaiian island of Maui.

The larvae feed on Lipochaeta lavarum. They probably mine the leaves of their host plant.

== Taxonomy ==
Philodoria lipochaetaella belongs to the genus Philodoria, which includes numerous species that are known for their leaf-mining larvae. This genus is notable for its adaptive radiation in Hawaii, with many species evolving in association with specific native host plants.
