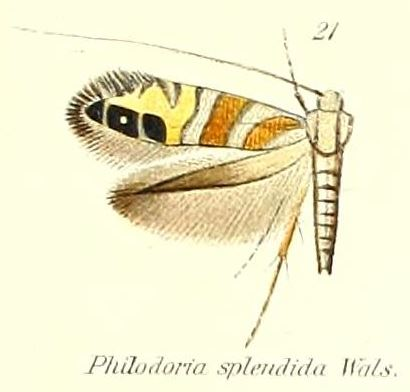
- Philodoria splendida

Scientific classification
- Kingdom: Animalia
- Phylum: Arthropoda
- Class: Insecta
- Order: Lepidoptera
- Family: Gracillariidae
- Subfamily: Gracillariinae
- Genus: Philodoria; Walsingham, 1907

Species
- See text

Synonyms
- Euphilodoria Zimmermann, 1978

= Philodoria =

Genus of moths

Philodoria is a genus of moths in the family Gracillariidae. All species are endemic to Hawaii. It was first described by Lord Walsingham in 1907.

== Life history ==
The larvae mine the leaves of many kinds of broad-leaved plants. Some of the species pupate within the larval mines, but others emerge from their mines to pupate.

== Species ==
- Philodoria auromagnifica Walsingham, 1907
- Philodoria basalis Walsingham, 1907
- Philodoria costalis Swezey, 1934
- Philodoria dubauticola (Swezey, 1940)
- Philodoria dubautiella (Swezey, 1913)
- Philodoria epibathra (Walsingham, 1907)
- Philodoria floscula Walsingham, 1907
- Philodoria hauicola (Swezey, 1910)
- Philodoria hibiscella (Swezey, 1913)
- Philodoria lipochaetaella (Swezey, 1940)
- Philodoria lysimachiella Swezey, 1928
- Philodoria marginestrigata (Walsingham, 1907)
- Philodoria micropetala Walsingham, 1907
- Philodoria molokaiensis Swezey, 1928
- Philodoria naenaeiella (Swezey, 1940)
- Philodoria neraudicola (Swezey, 1920)
- Philodoria nigrella Walsingham, 1907
- Philodoria nigrelloides (Swezey, 1946)
- Philodoria pipturiana Swezey, 1923
- Philodoria pipturicola Swezey, 1915
- Philodoria pipturiella Swezey, 1923
- Philodoria pittosporella (Swezey, 1928)
- Philodoria sciallactis (Meyrick, 1928)
- Philodoria spilota (Walsingham, 1907)
- Philodoria splendida Walsingham, 1907
- Philodoria succedanea Walsingham, 1907
- Philodoria touchardiella (Swezey, 1928)
- Philodoria ureraella (Swezey, 1915)
- Philodoria urerana (Swezey, 1915)
- Philodoria wilkesiella Swezey, 1940
