= Philodoria molokaiensis =

Scientific classification
- Domain: Eukaryota
- Kingdom: Animalia
- Phylum: Arthropoda
- Class: Insecta
- Order: Lepidoptera
- Family: Gracillariidae
- Genus: Philodoria
- Species: P. molokaiensis

Binomial name
- Philodoria molokaiensis Swezey, 1928

Species of moth

Philodoria molokaiensis is a moth of the family Gracillariidae. It was first described by Otto Herman Swezey in 1928. It is endemic to the Hawaiian island of Molokai.

The larvae feed on Lysimachia hillebrandi. They likely mine the leaves of their host plant, similar to other species within the genus Philodoria. Leaf mining is a behavior where the larvae create tunnels inside the leaf tissue, feeding on the internal cells. This genus is characterized by its diverse larval host plants, with several species known to mine leaves from different plant orders, such as Asterales and Rosales.

Philodoria is a genus of endemic Hawaiian leaf-mining moths, containing approximately 30 species. The genus is known for its complex taxonomy, and recent studies have provided new insights into the relationships and behaviors of these moths. For instance, recent taxonomic and molecular studies have revealed new species and provided detailed descriptions of their genital structures, immature stages, and biology. These studies have helped to clarify the classification within the genus and highlight the specialized ecological roles of Philodoria species in Hawaiian ecosystems.

The genus Philodoria can be distinguished from other genera in the Gracillariidae subfamily Ornixolinae by specific morphological features, such as the presence of small frenular bristles along the costa in both sexes and a sclerotized, semicircular lamella antevaginalis in females.

Conservation efforts are crucial for these moths as they depend on the survival of their native host plants, many of which are threatened or endangered. The Hawaiian Islands, while only a small fraction of the area of the United States, account for a significant portion of the nation’s documented plant and animal extinctions. The preservation of these moths and their host plants is vital for maintaining the unique biodiversity of Hawaii.
