= Philodoria neraudicola =

Scientific classification
- Domain: Eukaryota
- Kingdom: Animalia
- Phylum: Arthropoda
- Class: Insecta
- Order: Lepidoptera
- Family: Gracillariidae
- Genus: Philodoria
- Species: P. neraudicola

Binomial name
- Philodoria neraudicola (Swezey, 1920)

Synonyms
- Gracilaria neraudicola Swezey, 1920; Parectopa neraudicola

Species of moth

Philodoria neraudicola is a moth of the family Gracillariidae. It was first described by Otto Swezey in 1920. It is endemic to the Hawaiian islands of Kauai, Oahu, Molokai and Hawaii.

The larvae feed on Neraudia melastomaefolia and Pipturus albidus. They mine the leaves of their host plant.
