= Hesperomannia arborescens =

Conservation status
- Critically Endangered (IUCN 2.3)

Scientific classification
- Kingdom: Plantae
- Clade: Tracheophytes
- Clade: Angiosperms
- Clade: Eudicots
- Clade: Asterids
- Order: Asterales
- Family: Asteraceae
- Genus: Hesperomannia
- Species: H. arborescens

Binomial name
- Hesperomannia arborescens Gray

Species of flowering plant

Hesperomannia arborescens, the Lanai island-aster or Lanai hesperomannia, is a species of flowering plant in the family Asteraceae.

It is found only in Hawaii, where there are fewer than 200 individuals remaining. Most are in the Koʻolau Range of Oahu, and there are a few on Molokai, Maui, and Lanai. It is a perennial shrub or tree. It grows in wet forests and shrublands.

It is threatened by habitat loss.
