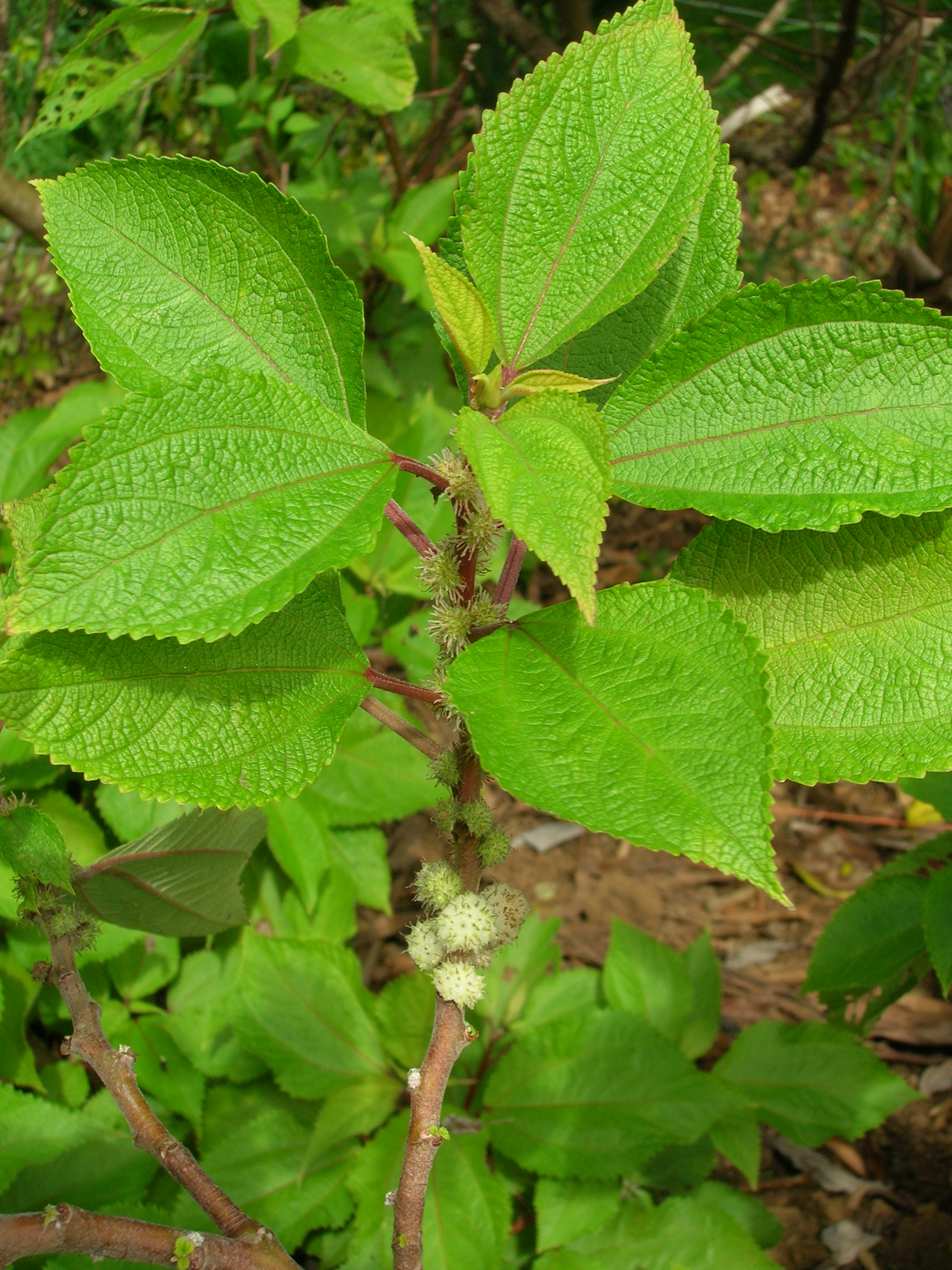
- Māmaki (P. albidus)

Scientific classification
- Kingdom: Plantae
- Clade: Tracheophytes
- Clade: Angiosperms
- Clade: Eudicots
- Clade: Rosids
- Order: Rosales
- Family: Urticaceae
- Tribe: Boehmerieae
- Genus: Pipturus; Wedd.

Species
- See text

Synonyms
- Botrymorus Miq.; Perlarius Rumph. ex Kuntze

= Pipturus =

Genus of flowering plants

Pipturus is a flowering plant genus in the nettle family, Urticaceae. It includes 29 species which range from the Western Indian Ocean islands to Malesia, Taiwan, the Ryukyu Islands, Papuasia, northern and Eastern Australia, and the Pacific Islands.

== Species ==
29 species are accepted.

- Pipturus albidus (Hook. & Arn.) A.Gray ex H.Mann – Māmaki (Hawaii)
- Pipturus angustifolius Merr.
- Pipturus argenteus (G.Forst.) Wedd., 1869 – Queensland grass-cloth plant, native mulberry
- Pipturus asper Wedd.
- Pipturus australium J.Florence
- Pipturus ceramicus Miq.
- Pipturus cinnamomeus Ridl.
- Pipturus dentatus (C.B.Rob.) C.B.Rob.
- Pipturus forbesii Krajina
- Pipturus grandifolius Ridl.
- Pipturus grantii J.Florence
- Pipturus henryanus F.Br.
- Pipturus hubertii Bennet
- Pipturus kauaiensis A.Heller
- Pipturus ledermannii H.J.P.Winkl.
- Pipturus lithospermum H.J.P.Winkl.
- Pipturus micronesicus Kaneh.
- Pipturus montanus P.Royen
- Pipturus oreophilus J.Florence
- Pipturus platyphyllus Wedd.
- Pipturus polynesicus Skottsb.
- Pipturus pullei H.J.P.Winkl.
- Pipturus ruber A.Heller
- Pipturus schaeferi J.Florence (French Polynesia)
- Pipturus subinteger H.J.P.Winkl.
- Pipturus succulentus Elmer
- Pipturus tooviianus J.Florence
- Pipturus verticillatus H.J.P.Winkl.
- Pipturus vitiensis A.C.Sm.

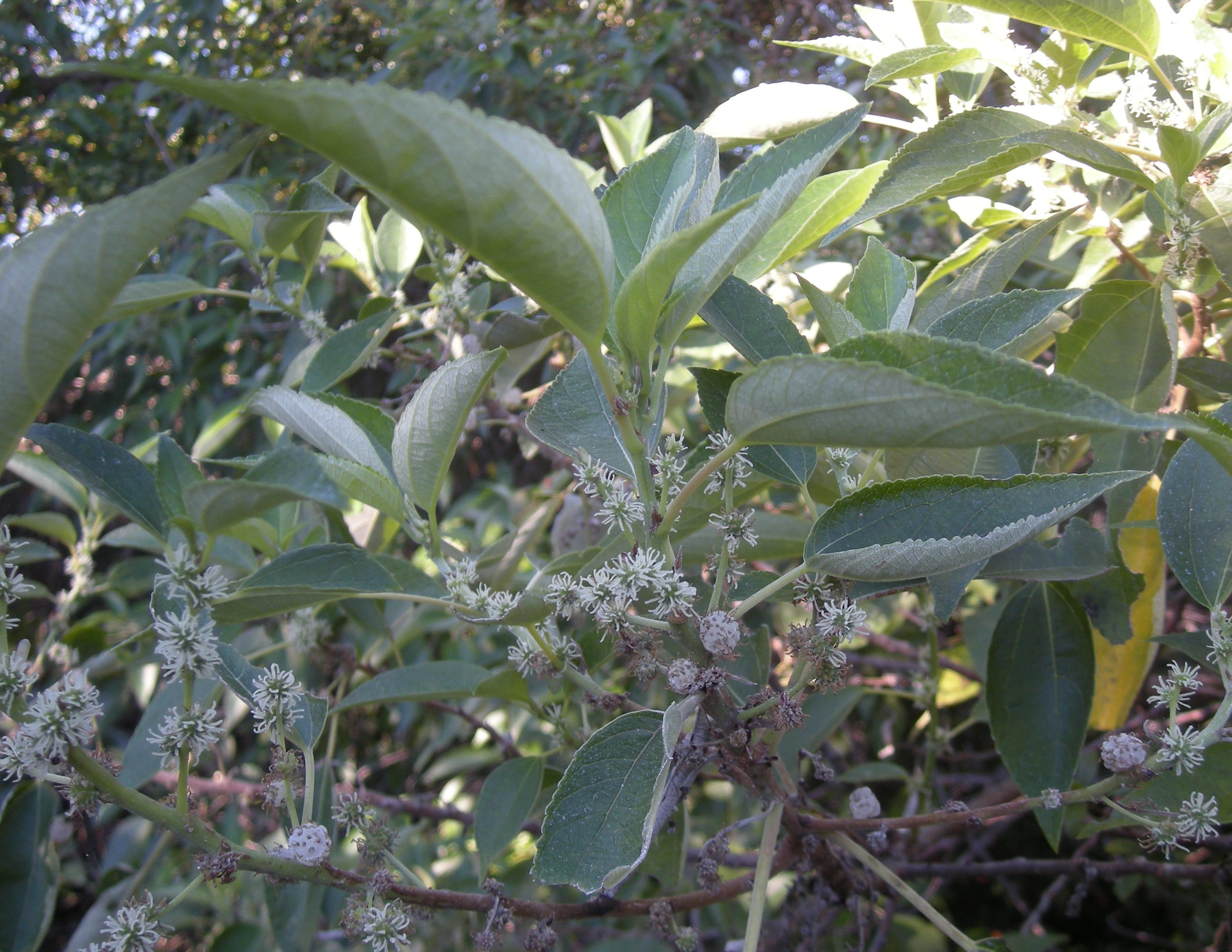
Pipturus argenteus flowers and fruit
