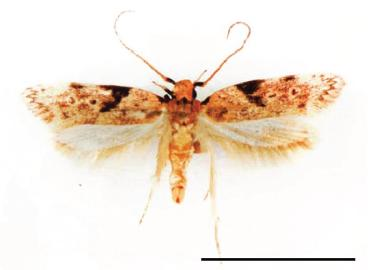

Scientific classification
- Domain: Eukaryota
- Kingdom: Animalia
- Phylum: Arthropoda
- Class: Insecta
- Order: Lepidoptera
- Family: Cosmopterigidae
- Genus: Hyposmocoma
- Species: H. nebulifera

Binomial name
- Hyposmocoma nebulifera Walsingham, 1907

= Hyposmocoma nebulifera =

Species of moth

Hyposmocoma nebulifera is a species of moth of the family Cosmopterigidae. It was first described by Lord Walsingham in 1907. It is endemic to the Hawaiian island of Oahu. The type locality is the Waianae Range, where it was collected at an elevation of 2,000 feet (610 m).

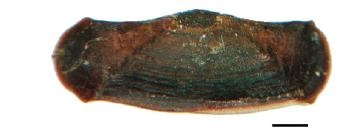
Larval case

The length of the forewings is 5.8–6 mm for males and 6.5–7.2 mm for females.

The larval case is dark brown, smooth, 8.1 mm in length and 2.5 mm wide.
