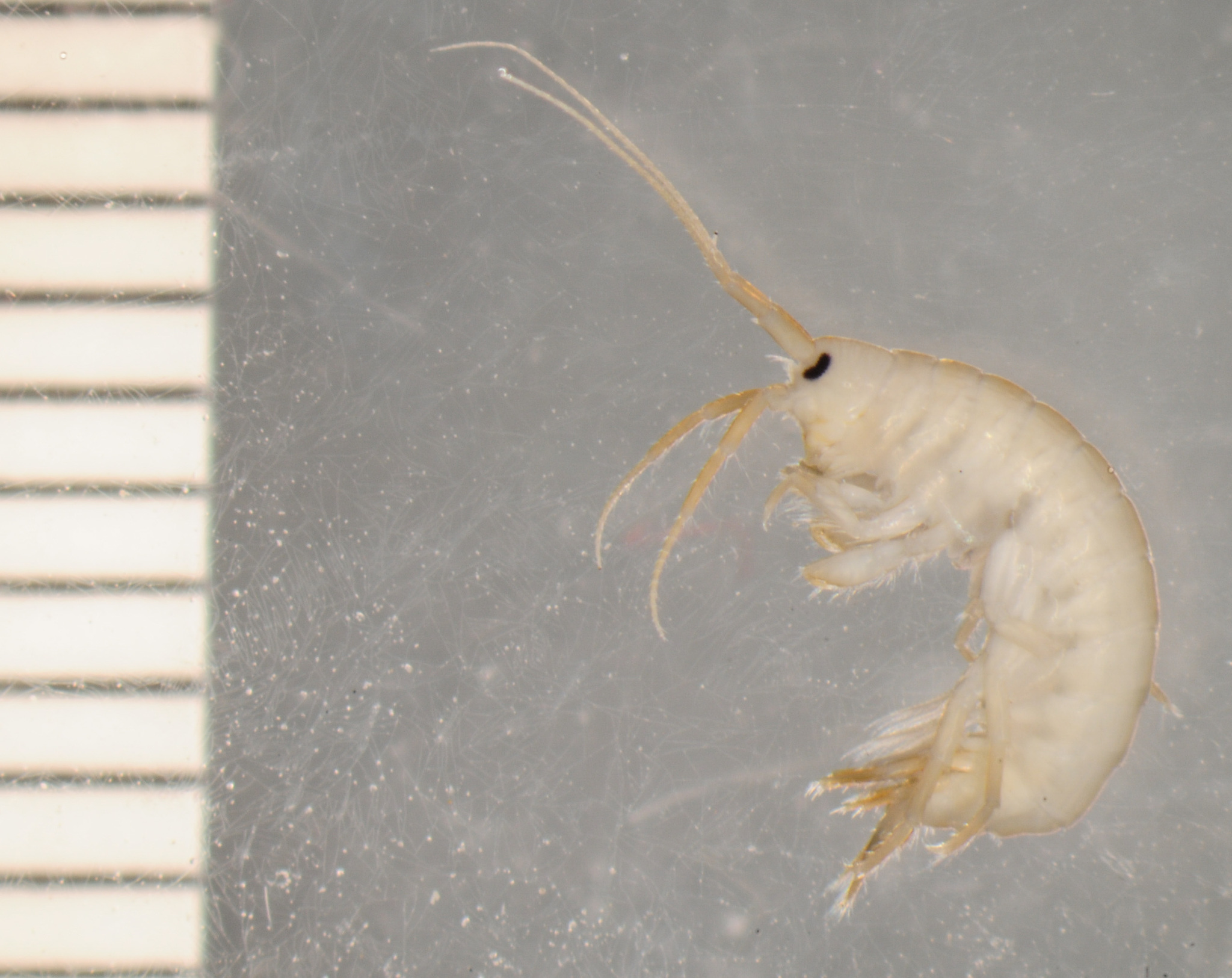

Conservation status
- Vulnerable (IUCN 2.3)

- Endangered (ESA)

Scientific classification
- Kingdom: Animalia
- Phylum: Arthropoda
- Class: Malacostraca
- Order: Amphipoda
- Family: Gammaridae
- Genus: Gammarus
- Species: G. hyalelloides

Binomial name
- Gammarus hyalelloides Cole, 1976

= Gammarus hyalelloides =

Species of crustacean

Gammarus hyalelloides, the diminutive amphipod is a species of amphipod crustacean in the family Gammaridae. It is endemic to four springs in Jeff Davis County and Reeves County, Texas, and is listed as a vulnerable species on the IUCN Red List.

== Description and ecology ==
Gammarus hyalelloides is the smallest freshwater amphipod in North America. Males are 5.8–7.8 mm (0.23–0.31 in) long, while sexually mature females are 5.0–7.3 mm (0.20–0.29 in). They live in beds of Chara at the mouth of Phantom Lake Spring.

Gammarus hyalelloides makes up more than 70% of the diet of Gambusia nobilis in the Phantom Lake Spring refuge (30°56′5″N 103°50′58″W) in Jeff Davis County, Texas. Other biota found in the Phantom Lake Spring include the snails Pyrgulopsis texana and Lyrodes cheatumi. The absence of Hyalella azteca may have allowed speciation to take place in the genus Gammarus, with one species entering the vacant niche, and reducing in size to become G. hyalelloides.

== Taxonomic history ==
The first collections of G. hyalelloides were made in 1967 at the Phantom Lake Spring. The amphipods were originally thought to be the common and widespread Hyalella azteca, but were later recognized as a new and distinct species of Gammarus.

The type specimens were deposited in the United States National Museum (holotype male: USNM 151957; paratype female: USNM 151958). Further paratype series were deposited at the same museum, and at the National Museum of Canada.

G. hyalelloides is part of the Gammarus pecos species complex, alongside Gammarus pecos and Gammarus desperatus; all three species are restricted to the Pecos River basin of Texas and New Mexico.
