= Agricultural pollution =

Type of pollution caused by agriculture

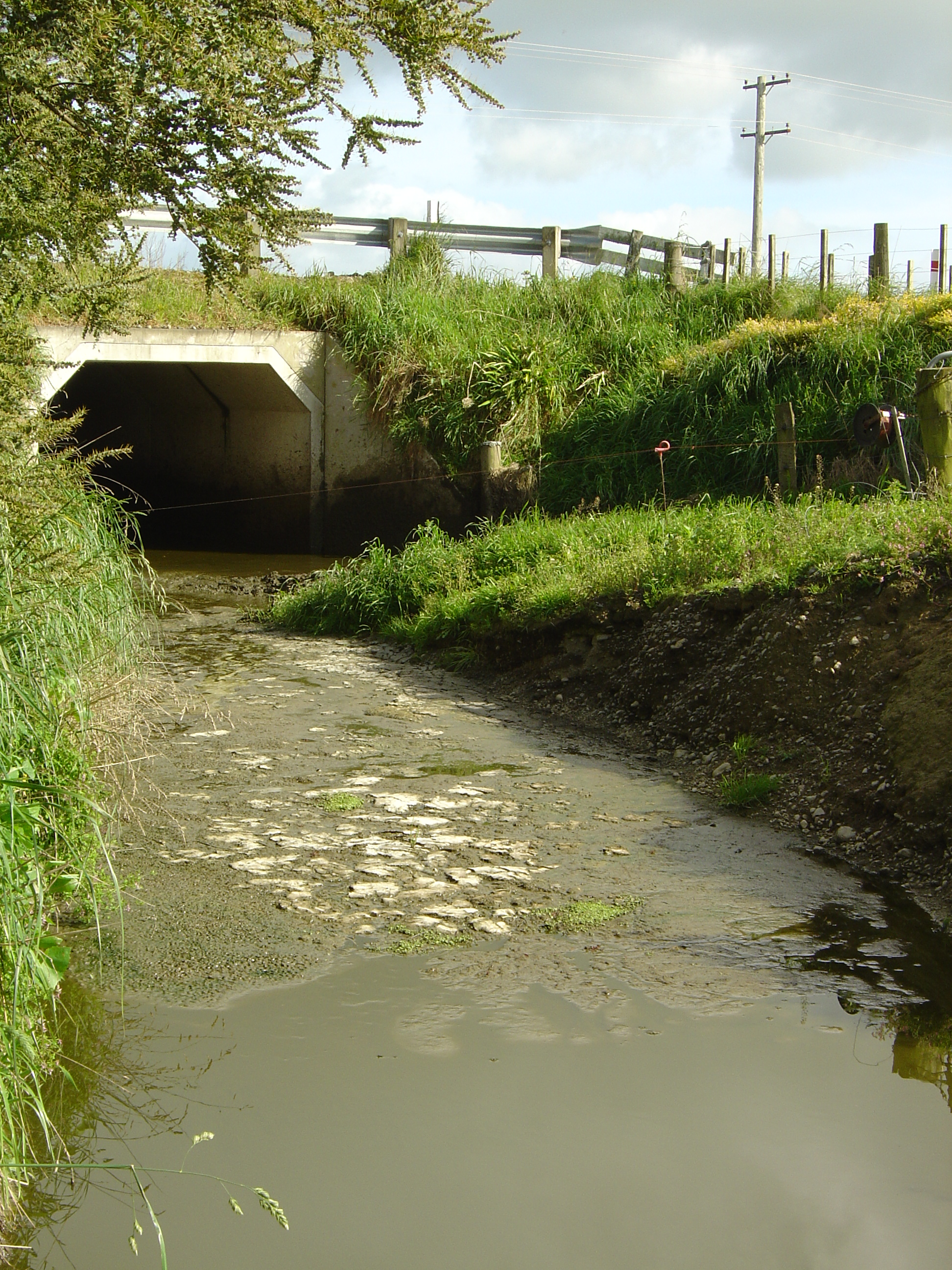
Water pollution due to dairy farming in the Wairarapa area of New Zealand (photographed in 2003)

Agricultural pollution problem refers to biotic and abiotic byproducts of farming practices that result in contamination or degradation of the environment and surrounding ecosystems, and/or cause injury to humans and their economic interests. The pollution may come from a variety of sources, ranging from point source water pollution (from a single discharge point) to more diffuse, landscape-level causes, also known as non-point source pollution and air pollution. Once in the environment these pollutants can have both direct effects in surrounding ecosystems, e.g. killing local wildlife or contaminating drinking water, and downstream effects such as dead zones caused by agricultural runoff is concentrated in large water bodies.

Management practices, or ignorance of them, play a crucial role in the amount and impact of these pollutants. Management techniques range from animal management and housing to the spread of pesticides and fertilizers in global agricultural practices, which can have major environmental impacts. Bad management practices include poorly managed animal feeding operations, overgrazing, plowing, fertilizer, and improper, excessive, or badly timed use of pesticides.

Pollutants from agriculture greatly affect water quality and can be found in lakes, rivers, wetlands, estuaries, and groundwater. Pollutants from farming include sediments, nutrients, pathogens, pesticides, metals, and salts. Animal agriculture has an outsized impact on pollutants that enter the environment. Bacteria and pathogens in manure can make their way into streams and groundwater if grazing, storing manure in lagoons and applying manure to fields is not properly managed. Air pollution caused by agriculture through land use changes and animal agriculture practices have an outsized impact on climate change. Addressing these concerns was a central part of the IPCC Special Report on Climate Change and Land as well as in the 2024 UNEP Actions on Air Quality report. Mitigation of agricultural pollution is a key component in the development of a sustainable food system.

== Abiotic sources ==
=== Pesticides ===
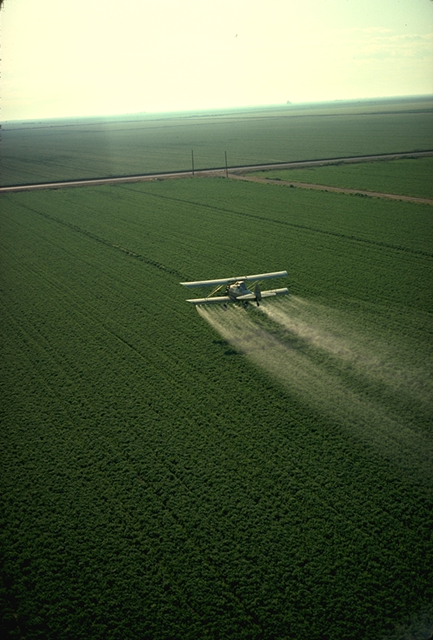
Aerial application of pesticide

It has been conceded that in the absence of pest control measures, crop losses before harvesting would typically amount to 40 percent. Pesticide persistence is nonetheless a major issue. For example 2,4-D and atrazine have with lifetimes up to 20 years. DDT, aldrin, dieldrin, endrin, heptachlor, and toxaphene are also long-lived. The persistence of pesticides and herbicides persist depends on the compound's unique chemistry. Pesticides can also accumulate in animals that eat contaminated pests and soil organisms. The primary danger associated with pesticide application lies in its impact on non-target organisms.

In principle, biopesticides, derived from natural sources, could reduce overall agricultural pollution. Their utilization is modest. Furthermore, biopesticides often suffer the same negative impacts as synthetic pesticides. In the United States, biopesticides are subject to fewer environmental regulations. Many biopesticides are permitted under the National Organic Program, United States Department of Agriculture, standards for organic crop production.

Pesticide leaching occurs when aqueous solutions of pesticides migrate to off-target sites. Leaching is a major source of groundwater pollution. Leaching is affected by the soil, the pesticide, and rainfall and irrigation. Leaching is more problematic with water-soluble pesticides and when the soil tends to be sandy in texture; if excessive watering occurs just after pesticide application; if the adsorption ability of the pesticide to the soil is low. In addition to treated fields, Leaching may also originate from pesticide mixing areas, pesticide application machinery washing sites, or disposal areas.

=== Fertilizers ===
While providing crops with nutrients to increase crop yields, fertilizers can pose risks to human and ecological health. A typical problem is eutrophication.

Most common nitrogen sources are NO_{3}^{−} (nitrate) and NH_{4}^{+} (ammonium). These fertilizers have greatly increased the productivity of agricultural land:

With average crop yields remaining at the 1900 level the crop harvest in the year 2000 would have required nearly four times more land and the cultivated area would have claimed nearly half of all ice-free continents, rather than under 15% of the total land area that is required today.

— Vaclav Smil, Nitrogen cycle and world food production, Volume 2, pages 9–13

Although leading to increased crop yield, nitrogen fertilizers can also negatively affect groundwater and surface waters, pollute the atmosphere, and degrade soil health. Not all nutrient applied through fertilizer are taken up by the crops, and the remainder accumulates in the soil or is lost as runoff. Nitrate fertilizers are much more likely to be lost to the soil profile through runoff because of its high solubility and like charges between the molecule and negatively charged clay particles. High application rates of nitrogen-containing fertilizers combined with the high water-solubility of nitrate leads to increased runoff into surface water as well as leaching into groundwater, thereby causing groundwater pollution. Nitrate levels above 10 mg/L (10 ppm) in groundwater can cause "blue baby syndrome" (acquired methemoglobinemia) in infants and possibly thyroid disease and various types of cancer. Nitrogen fixation, which converts atmospheric nitrogen (N_{2}) to ammonia, and denitrification, which converts biologically available nitrogen compounds to N_{2} and N_{2}O, are two of the most important metabolic processes involved in the nitrogen cycle because they are the largest inputs and outputs of nitrogen to ecosystems. They allow nitrogen to flow between the atmosphere, which is around 78% nitrogen) and the biosphere. Other significant processes in the nitrogen cycle are nitrification and ammonification which convert ammonium to nitrate or nitrite and organic matter to ammonia respectively. Because these processes keep nitrogen concentrations relatively stable in most ecosystems, a large influx of nitrogen from agricultural runoff can cause serious disruption. A common result of this in aquatic ecosystems is eutrophication, which in turn creates hypoxic and anoxic conditions – both of which are deadly and/or damaging to many species.. Beyond eutrophication, nitrogen pollution—specifically in the form of nitrite (NO_{2}^{−})—acts as a significant driver of species turnover in riverine ecosystems. Research indicates that aquatic invertebrates exhibit a wide range of sensitivities; while molluscs are relatively tolerant, aquatic insects such as mayflies and stoneflies are highly sensitive to nitrite exposure. In groups like amphipods, sensitivity varies by habitat, with upstream species (e.g., Gammarus fossarum) being more vulnerable than midstream or invasive downstream species (e.g., Gammarus roeselii). This differential sensitivity can lead to the replacement of native sensitive taxa with more tolerant ones, potentially altering ecosystem functions like leaf litter decomposition and nutrient cycling. Nitrogen fertilization can also release NH_{3} gases into the atmosphere which can then be converted into NO_{x} compounds. A greater amount of NO_{x} compounds in the atmosphere can result in the acidification of aquatic ecosystems and cause various respiratory issues in humans. Fertilization can also release N_{2}O which is a greenhouse gas and can facilitate the destruction of ozone (O_{3}) in the stratosphere. Soils that receive nitrogen fertilizers can also be damaged. An increase in plant available nitrogen will increase a crop's net primary production, and eventually, soil microbial activity will increase as a result of the larger inputs of nitrogen from fertilizers and carbon compounds through decomposed biomass. Excess nitrogen can disrupt mutualisms; for example, in the legumes-rhizobia resource mutualism nitrogen deposition results in the evolution of less-cooperative rhizobia. Because of the increase in decomposition in the soil, its organic matter content will be depleted which results in lower overall soil health.

==== Phosphorus ====
The most common form of phosphorus fertilizer is phosphate (PO_{4}^{3-}). It is applied as synthetic phosphate salts as well as manure and compost. Phosphorus is essential for all life. Most agricultural crops only require a small amount of phosphorus, as such, the amount of phosphorus supplied is often excessive. Excess phosphorus typically enters surface waters. The amount that enters surface waters is relatively low compared to the amount applied as fertilizer, but phosphorus often acts as a limiting nutrient in most environments by restricting the growth of algae and aquatic plants, even small amount can disrupt an ecosystem's natural phosphorus biogeochemical cycles.

Phosphorus is largest contributor to eutrophication, especially in freshwaters. In addition to depleting oxygen levels in surface waters, algae and cyanobacteria blooms can produce cyanotoxins which are harmful to human and animal health as well as many aquatic organisms.

Cadmium is common in phosphorus-containing fertilizers varies considerably and can be problematic.

The phosphate rock used in their manufacture can contain as much as 188 mg/kg cadmium (examples are deposits on Nauru and the Christmas islands). Continuous use of high-cadmium fertilizer can contaminate soil and plants. Limits to the cadmium content of phosphate fertilizers has been considered by the European Commission. Producers of phosphorus-containing fertilizers now select phosphate rock based on the cadmium content. Phosphate rocks can also contain high levels of fluoride. Consequently, the widespread use of phosphate fertilizers has increased soil fluoride concentrations.

It has been found that food contamination from fertilizer is of little concern as plants accumulate little fluoride from the soil; of greater concern is the possibility of fluoride toxicity to livestock that ingest contaminated soils. Also of possible concern are the effects of fluoride on soil microorganisms.

Radioactive elements

=== From equipment and agricultural plastics ===
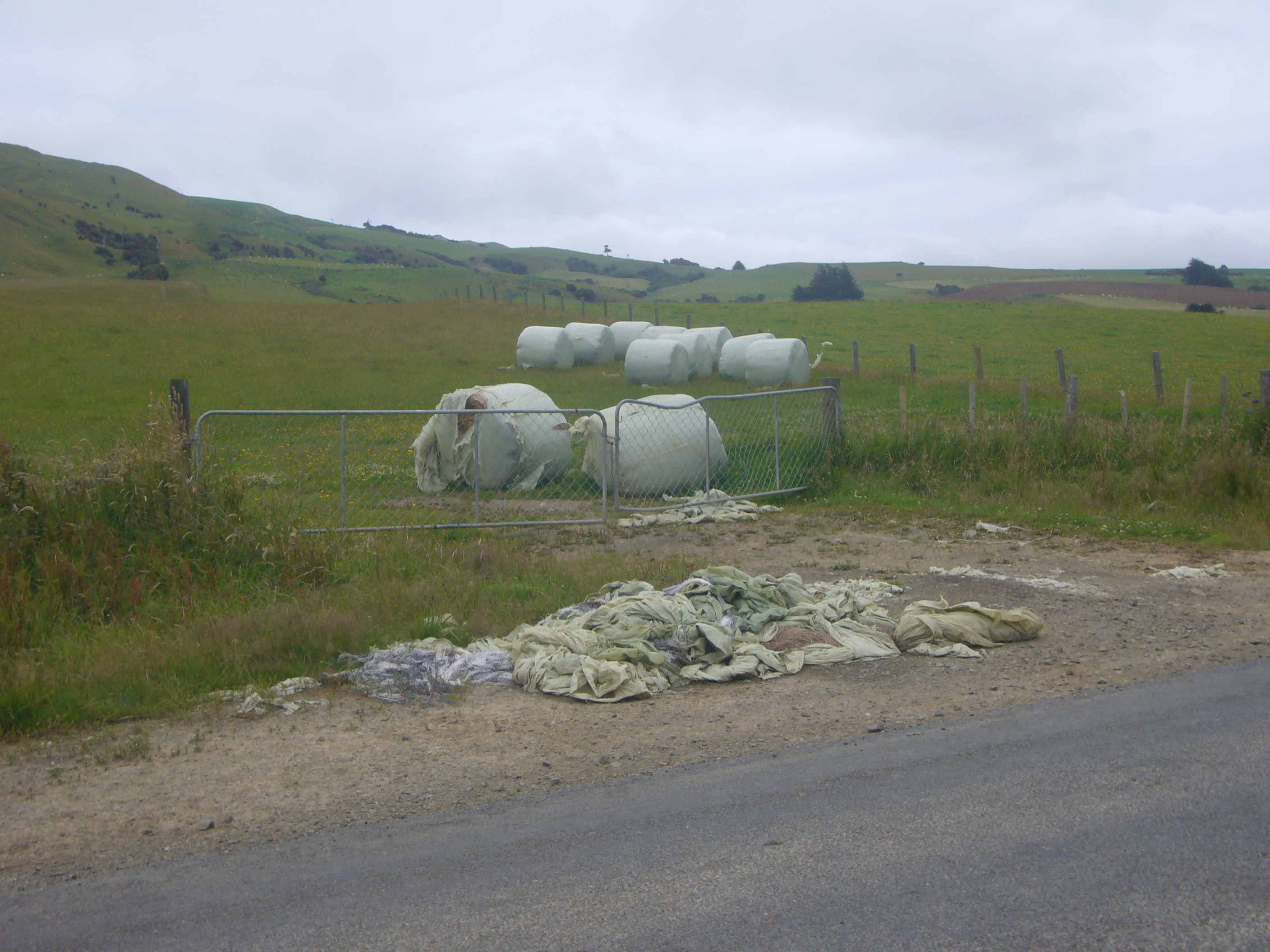
Hale bales on the side of the road that were covered in protective plastic. Some of the used plastic has been left on the side of the road, as plastic waste, that can break down in the environment.

Farm machinery and equipment emit substantial quantities of harmful gases, and operation of the machinery can result in other chemical contamination, such as oil spills, hydraulic fluid leakage, and tire particulates.

Other equipment and materials used in agriculture can introduce pollutants into the soil, and subsequently the environment. For example, the widespread use of plastic sheeting for greenhouses, plastic storage for applications like animal feed and seed bags and silage, and plastic mulch means that both microplastic and macroplastic are increasingly introduced into farmed landscapes. A 2021 study by FAO of plastic waste in agriculture, found an estimated 10 million tons of plastic waste produced each year. Collection of agricultural plastics is very low globally, with much of never getting collected.

=== Land management ===
==== Soil erosion and sedimentation ====
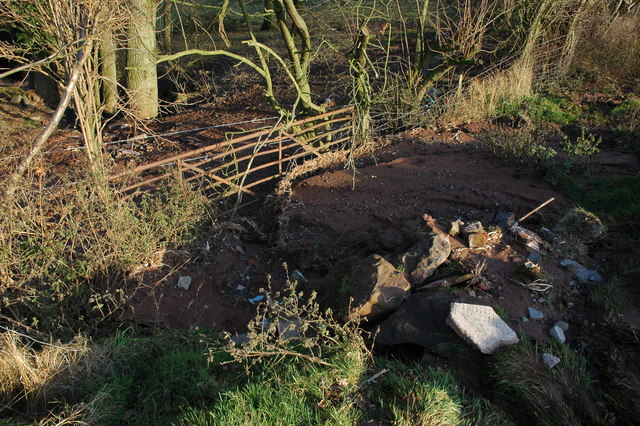
Soil erosion: soil has washed from a ploughed field through this gate and into a watercourse beyond.

Agriculture contributes greatly to soil erosion and sediment deposition through intensive management or inefficient land cover. It is estimated that agricultural land degradation is leading to an irreversible decline in fertility on about 6 million ha of fertile land each year. The accumulation of sediments (i.e. sedimentation) in runoff water affects water quality in various ways. Sedimentation can decrease the transport capacity of ditches, streams, rivers, and navigation channels. It can also limit the amount of light penetrating the water, which affects aquatic biota. The resulting turbidity from sedimentation can interfere with feeding habits of fishes, affecting population dynamics. Sedimentation also affects the transport and accumulation of pollutants, including phosphorus and various pesticides.

==== Tillage and nitrous oxide emissions ====
Natural soil biogeochemical processes result in the emission of various greenhouse gases, including nitrous oxide. Agricultural management practices can affect emission levels. For example, tillage levels have also been shown to affect nitrous oxide emissions.

=== Organic farming and conservation agriculture in mitigation ===
==== Organic farming ====
From an environmental perspective, fertilizing, overproduction and the use of pesticides in conventional farming has caused, and is causing, enormous damage worldwide to local ecosystems, soil health, biodiversity, groundwater and drinking water supplies, and sometimes farmers' health and fertility.

Organic farming typically reduces some environmental impact relative to conventional farming, but the scale of reduction can be difficult to quantify and varies depending on farming methods. In some cases, reducing food waste and dietary changes might provide greater benefits. A 2020 study at the Technical University of Munich found that the greenhouse gas emissions of organically farmed plant-based food were lower than conventionally farmed plant-based food. The greenhouse gas costs of organically produced meat were approximately the same as non-organically produced meat. However, the same paper noted that a shift from conventional to organic practices would likely be beneficial for long-term efficiency and ecosystem services, and probably improve soil over time.

Recent research has suggested that the usage of organic fertilizers and cover crops can enhance soil organic carbon, nutrient cycling, and biodiversity. Simultaneously, it could also reduce greenhouse gas emissions when it is managed effectively. These practices contribute to climate change mitigation and sustainable agriculture when improving soil resilience and long-term fertility. [Khan et al., 2024]

A 2019 life-cycle assessment study found that converting the total agricultural sector (both crop and livestock production) for England and Wales to organic farming methods would result in a net increase in greenhouse gas emissions as increased overseas land use for production and import of crops would be needed to make up for lower organic yields domestically.

There are positive and negative environmental impacts of organic as compared to conventional farming. A meta-analysis of European studies revealed that in general, organic farming resulted in higher soil organic matter, lower nitrogen losses per hectare, and lower energy inputs. Others however, such as land use, nutrient pollution and greenhouse gas emissions were higher when measured per unit of agricultural output, highlighting the importance of the measurement method and farming system.

Biodiversity can also be promoted by organic farming. In a meta-analysis of 94 studies (average across all studies) it was concluded that organic farming resulted in around 30% more species richness than conventional farming, but this effect was different for each organism, crop, and landscape.

==== Conservation agriculture ====
Conservation agriculture relies on principles of minimal soil disturbance, the use of mulch and/or cover crops as soil cover, and crop species diversification. It enables the reduction of fertilizers, which in turn reduces ammonia emissions and greenhouse gas emissions. It also stabilizes soil, which slows down the release of carbon into the atmosphere.

== Biotic sources ==
=== Organic contaminants ===
Manures and biosolids, although having value as fertilizers, they may also contain contaminants, including pharmaceuticals and personal care products (PPCPs). A wide variety and vast quantity of PPCPs consumed by animals.

=== Greenhouse gases from fecal waste ===
The United Nations Food and Agriculture Organization (FAO) predicted that 18% of anthropogenic greenhouse gases come directly or indirectly from the world's livestock. This report also suggested that the emissions from livestock were greater than that of the transportation sector. While livestock do currently play a role in producing greenhouse gas emissions, the estimates have been argued to be a misrepresentation. While the FAO used a life-cycle assessment of animal agriculture (i.e. all aspects including emissions from growing crops for feed, transportation to slaughter, etc.), they did not apply the same assessment for the transportation sector.

Alternate sources claim that FAO estimates are too low, stating that the global livestock industry could be responsible for up to 51% of emitted atmospheric greenhouse gasses rather than 18%. Critics say the difference in estimates come from the FAO's use of outdated data. Regardless, if the FAO's report of 18% is accurate, that still makes livestock the second-largest greenhouse-gas-polluter.

A PNAS model showed that even if animals were completely removed from U.S. agriculture and diets, U.S. GHG emissions would be decreased by 2.6% only (or 28% of agricultural GHG emissions). This is because of the need to replace animal manures by fertilizers and to replace also other animal coproducts, and because livestock now use human-inedible food and fiber processing byproducts. Moreover, people would suffer from a greater number of deficiencies in essential nutrients although they would get a greater excess of energy, possibly leading to greater obesity.

=== Introduced species ===
==== Invasive species ====
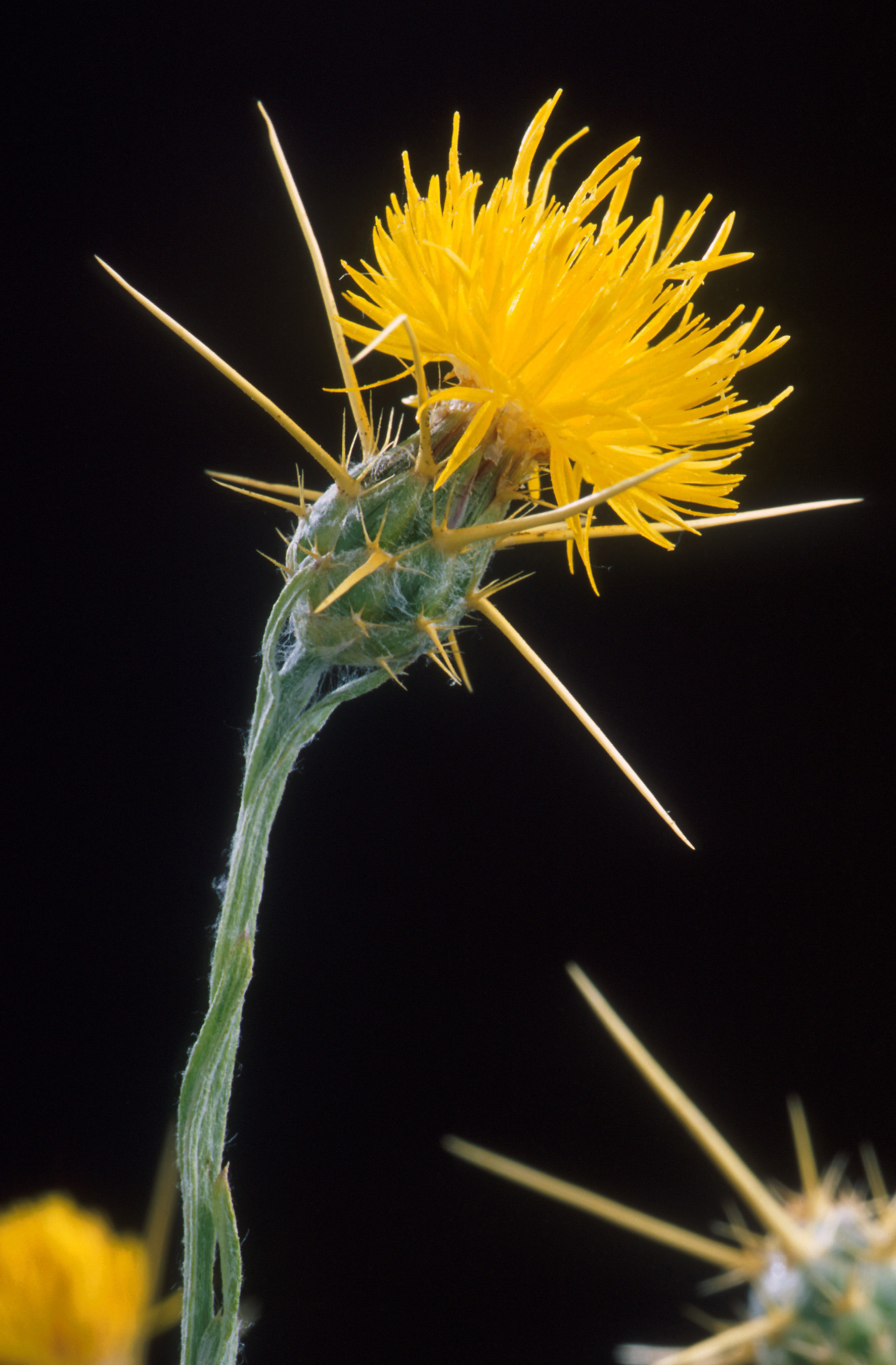
Centaurea solstitialis, an aggressively invasive weed, was probably introduced to North America in contaminated fodder seed. Agricultural practices such as tilling and livestock grazing aided in its rapid spread. It is toxic to horses, prevents native plants from growing (decreasing biodiversity and degrading natural ecosystems), and is a physical barrier to the migration of indigenous animals.

The increasing globalization of agriculture has resulted in the accidental transport of pests, weeds, and diseases to novel ranges. If they establish, they become an invasive species that can impact populations of native species and threaten agricultural production. For example, the transport of bumblebees reared in Europe and shipped to the United States and/or Canada for use as commercial pollinators has led to the introduction of an Old World parasite to the New World. This introduction may play a role in recent native bumble bee declines in North America. Agriculturally introduced species can also hybridize with native species resulting in a decline in genetic biodiversity and threaten agricultural production.

Habitat disturbance associated with farming practices themselves can also facilitate the establishment of these introduced organisms. Contaminated machinery, livestock and fodder, and contaminated crop or pasture seed can also lead to the spread of weeds.

Quarantines (see biosecurity) are one way in which prevention of the spread of invasive species can be regulated at the policy level. A quarantine is a legal instrument that restricts the movement of infested material from areas where an invasive species is present to areas in which it is absent. The World Trade Organization has international regulations concerning the quarantine of pests and diseases under the Agreement on the Application of Sanitary and Phytosanitary Measures. Individual countries often have their own quarantine regulations. In the United States, for example, the United States Department of Agriculture/Animal and Plant Health Inspection Service (USDA/APHIS) administers domestic (within the United States) and foreign (importations from outside the United States) quarantines. These quarantines are enforced by inspectors at state borders and ports of entry.

==== Biological control ====
The use of biological pest control agents, or using predators, parasitoids, parasites, and pathogens to control agricultural pests, has the potential to reduce agricultural pollution associated with other pest control techniques, such as pesticide use. The merits of introducing non-native biocontrol agents have been widely debated, however. Once released, the introduction of a biocontrol agent can be irreversible. Potential ecological issues could include the dispersal from agricultural habitats into natural environments, and host-switching or adapting to utilize a native species. In addition, predicting the interaction outcomes in complex ecosystems and potential ecological impacts prior to release can be difficult. One example of a biocontrol program that resulted in ecological damage occurred in North America, where a parasitoid of butterflies was introduced to control gypsy moth and browntail moth. This parasitoid is capable of utilizing many butterfly host species, and likely resulted in the decline and extirpation of several native silk moth species.

International exploration for potential biocontrol agents is aided by agencies such as the European Biological Control Laboratory, the United States Department of Agriculture/Agricultural Research Service (USDA/ARS), the Commonwealth Institute of Biological Control, and the International Organization for Biological Control of Noxious Plants and Animals. In order to prevent agricultural pollution, quarantine and extensive research on the organism's potential efficacy and ecological impacts are required prior to introduction. If approved, attempts are made to colonize and disperse the biocontrol agent in appropriate agricultural settings. Continual evaluations on their efficacy are conducted.

=== Genetically modified organisms (GMO) ===
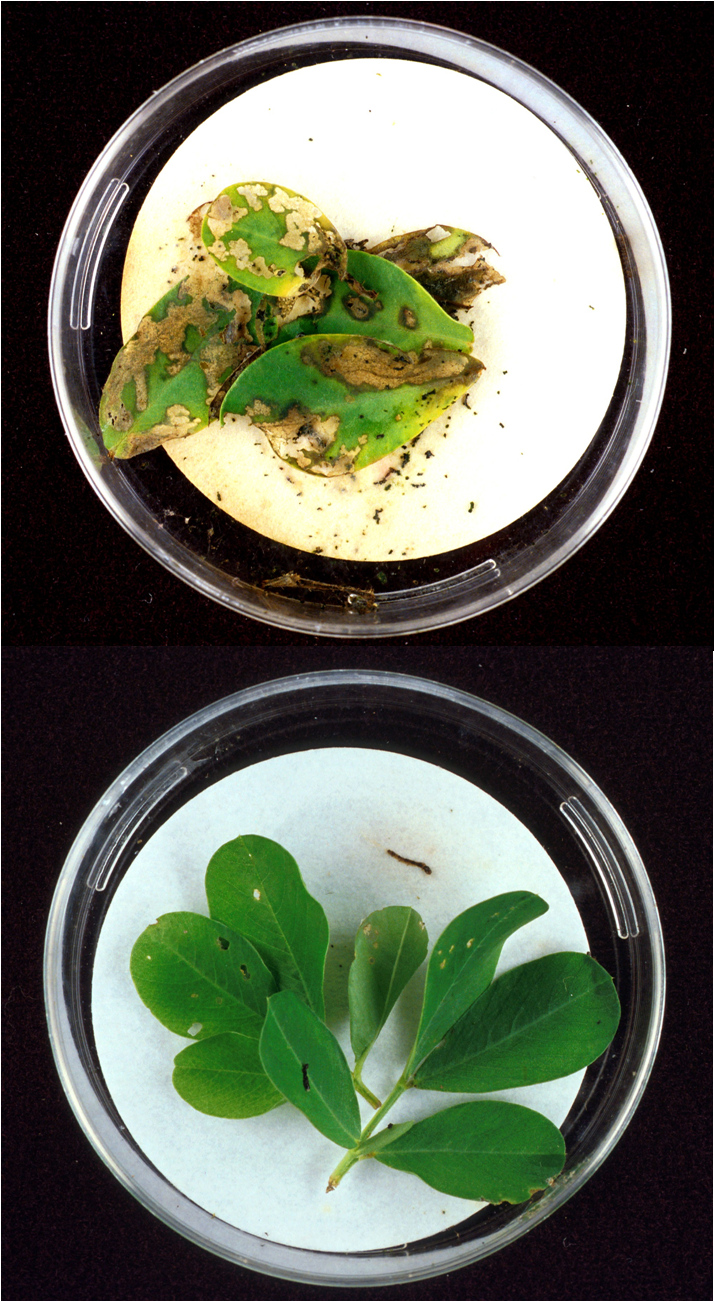
(Top) Non transgenic peanut leaves showing extensive damage from European corn borer larvae. (Bottom) Peanut leaves genetically engineered to produce Bt toxins are protected from herbivory damage.

==== Genetic contamination and ecological effects ====
GMO crops can, however, result in genetic contamination of native plant species through hybridization. This could lead to increased weediness of the plant or the extinction of the native species. In addition, the transgenic plant itself may become a weed if the modification improves its fitness in a given environment.

There are also concerns that non-target organisms, such as pollinators and natural enemies, could be poisoned by accidental ingestion of Bt-producing plants. A recent study testing the effects of Bt corn pollen dusting nearby milkweed plants on larval feeding of the monarch butterfly found that the threat to populations of the monarch was low.

The use of GMO crop plants engineered for herbicide resistance can also indirectly increase the amount of agricultural pollution associated with herbicide use. For example, the increased use of herbicide in herbicide-resistant corn fields in the mid-western United States is decreasing the amount of milkweeds available for monarch butterfly larvae.

Regulation of the release of genetic modified organisms vary based on the type of organism and the country concerned.

==== GMO as a tool of pollution reduction ====
While there may be some concerns regarding the use of GM products, it may also be the solution to some of the existing animal agriculture pollution issues. One of the main sources of pollution, particularly vitamin and mineral drift in soils, comes from a lack of digestive efficiency in animals. By improving digestive efficiency, it is possible to minimize both the cost of animal production and the environmental damage. One successful example of this technology and its potential application is the Enviropig.

The Enviropig is a genetically modified Yorkshire pig that expresses phytase in its saliva. Grains, such as corn and wheat, have phosphorus that is bound in a naturally indigestible form known as phytic acid. Phosphorus, an essential nutrient for pigs, is then added to the diet, since it can not be broken down in the pigs digestive tract. As a result, nearly all of the phosphorus naturally found in the grain is wasted in the feces, and can contribute to elevated levels in the soil. Phytase is an enzyme that is able to break down the otherwise indigestible phytic acid, making it available to the pig. The ability of the Enviropig to digest the phosphorus from the grains eliminates the waste of that natural phosphorus (20-60% reduction), while also eliminating the need to supplement the nutrient in feed.

=== Animal management ===
==== Manure management ====
One of the main contributors to air, soil and water pollution is animal waste. According to a 2005 report by the USDA, more than 335–million tons of "dry matter" waste (the waste after water is removed) is produced annually on farms in the United States. Animal feeding operations produce about 100 times more manure than the amount of human sewage sludge processed in US municipal waste water plants each year. Diffuse source pollution from agricultural fertilizers is more difficult to trace, monitor and control. High nitrate concentrations are found in groundwater and may reach 50 mg/litre (the EU Directive limit). In ditches and river courses, nutrient pollution from fertilizers causes eutrophication. This is worse in winter, after autumn ploughing has released a surge of nitrates; winter rainfall is heavier increasing runoff and leaching, and there is lower plant uptake. EPA suggests that one dairy farm with 2,500 cows produces as much waste as a city with around 411,000 residents. The US National Research Council has identified odors as the most significant animal emission problem at the local level. Different animal systems have adopted several waste management procedures to deal with the large amount of waste produced annually.

The advantages of manure treatment are a reduction in the amount of manure that needs to be transported and applied to crops, as well as reduced soil compaction. Nutrients are reduced as well, meaning that less cropland is needed for manure to be spread upon. Manure treatment can also reduce the risk of human health and biosecurity risks by reducing the amount of pathogens present in manure. Undiluted animal manure or slurry is one hundred times more concentrated than domestic sewage, and can carry an intestinal parasite, Cryptosporidium, which is difficult to detect but can be passed to humans. Silage liquor (from fermented wet grass) is even stronger than slurry, with a low pH and very high biological oxygen demand. With a low pH, silage liquor can be highly corrosive; it can attack synthetic materials, causing damage to storage equipment, and leading to accidental spillage. All of these advantages can be optimized by using the right manure management system on the right farm based on the resources that are available.

==== Manure treatment ====
===== Composting =====
Composting is a solid manure management system that relies on solid manure from bedded pack pens, or the solids from a liquid manure separator. There are two methods of composting, active and passive. Manure is churned periodically during active composting, whereas in passive composting it is not. Passive composting has been found to have lower green house gas emissions due to incomplete decomposition and lower gas diffusion rates.

===== Solid-liquid separation =====
Manure can be mechanically separated into a solid and liquid portion for easier management. Liquids (4–8% dry matter) can be used easily in pump systems for convenient spread over crops and the solid fraction (15–30% dry matter) can be used as stall bedding, spread on crops, composted or exported.

===== Anaerobic digestion and lagoons =====
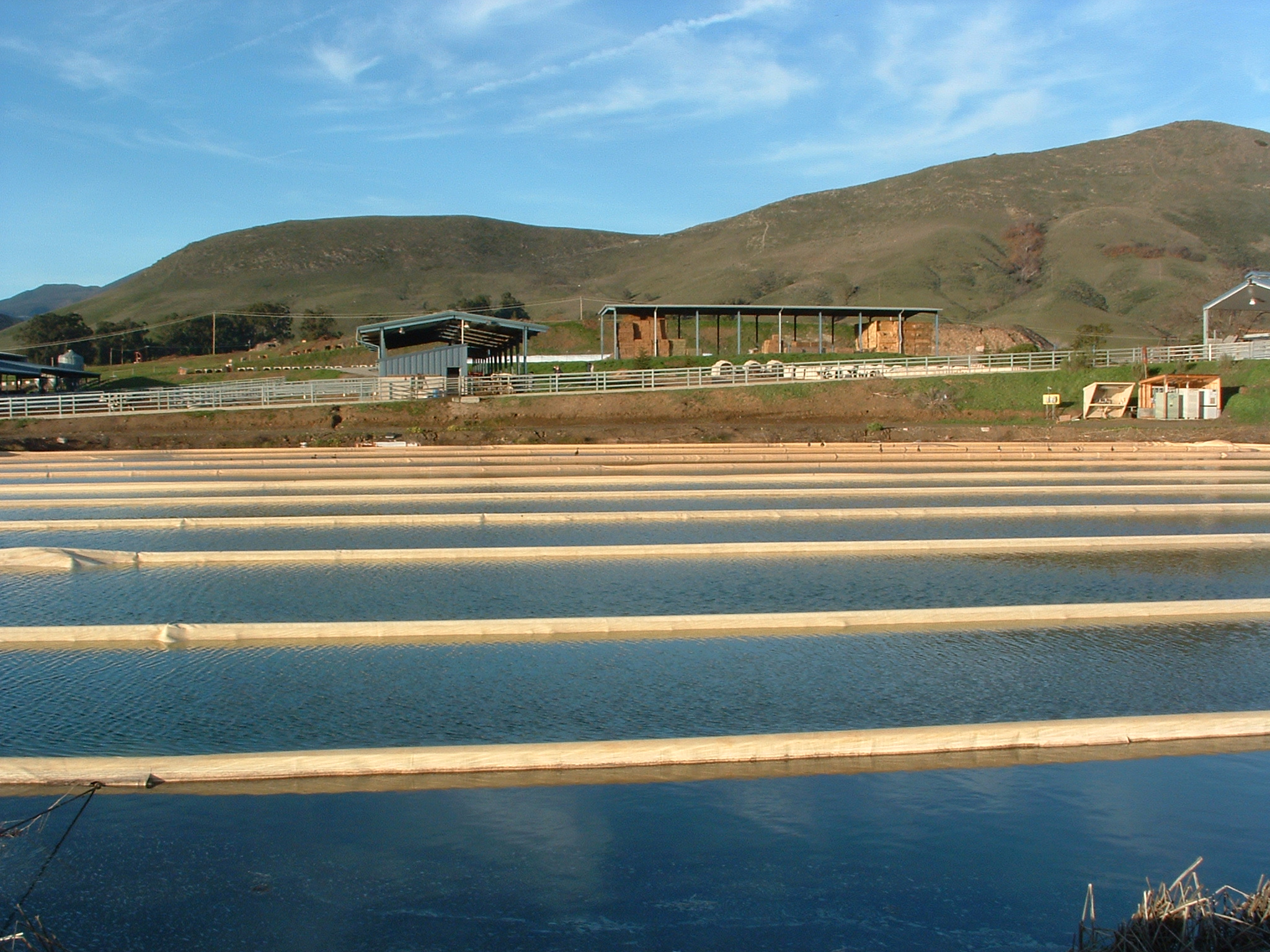
Anaerobic lagoon at a dairy

Anaerobic digestion is the biological treatment of liquid animal waste using bacteria in an area absent of air, which promotes the decomposition of organic solids. Hot water is used to heat the waste in order to increase the rate of biogas production. The remaining liquid is nutrient rich and can be used on fields as a fertilizer and methane gas that can be burned directly on the biogas stove or in an engine generator to produce electricity and heat. Methane is about 20 times more potent as a greenhouse gas than carbon dioxide, which has significant negative environmental effects if not controlled properly. Anaerobic treatment of waste is the best method for controlling the odor associated with manure management.

Biological treatment lagoons also use anaerobic digestion to break down solids, but at a much slower rate. Lagoons are kept at ambient temperatures as opposed to the heated digestion tanks. Lagoons require large land areas and high dilution volumes to work properly, so they do not work well in many climates in the northern United States. Lagoons also offer the benefit of reduced odor and biogas is made available for heat and electric power.

Studies have demonstrated that GHG emissions are reduced using aerobic digestion systems. GHG emission reductions and credits can help compensate for the higher installation cost of cleaner aerobic technologies and facilitate producer adoption of environmentally superior technologies to replace current anaerobic lagoons.

== See also ==
- Environmental impact of agriculture
- Agroecology
- Agricultural nutrient runoff
- Agricultural surface runoff
- Agricultural wastewater
- Bioeconomy
- Genetically modified food controversies
- Nutrient management
- Pest control
- Pesticide#Alternatives
- Tillage
