= Elsie Wilkins Sexton =

English zoologist and biological illustrator

- Born: 27 April 1868; Truro, Cornwall, England
- Died: 18 February 1959 (aged 90); Alfriston, Sussex, England
- Education: Truro School of Art
- Known for: Research on the taxonomy and genetic traits of genus Gammarus
- Scientific career
- Fields: Marine biology
- Workplaces: Marine Biological Association

Elsie Wilkins Sexton (née Wing, 27 April 1868 – 18 February 1959) was an English zoologist and biological illustrator.

== Early life and education ==
Sexton was born Alice Wilkins Wing at Truro, Cornwall on 27 April 1868. She studied at the Truro School of Art. In 1885 she and her family moved to Plymouth. Not long after moving, she met and married Louis Edwin Sexton.

== Career ==
Louis was a friend of Dr Edgar J Allen, the director of the Marine Biological Association and its laboratory. In 1900 Sexton began providing Dr Allen with scientific illustrations for his publications on polychaete worms and other invertebrates. Her illustrations were first published in 1902, when Sexton provided 12 plates to the British Museum's report on the collections made during the voyage of the Southern Cross.

Although Sexton never formally trained as a zoologist, in 1906 she undertook to identify and study amphipod specimens Dr Allen had collected on a field trip to the Bay of Biscay. She published her first scientific paper in 1908. She would continue to publish over 30 scientific papers by 1951. Her research into gammarids helped clarify the complicated taxonomy of those species.

Sexton had described several species of amphipods including Tryphosites alleni and Gammarus chevreuxi. The genus Sextonia was named in her honour. Sexton's discovery of a red-eyed mutation in the species Gammarus chevreuxi led to her starting a series of genetic experiments. Her work with this species also resulted in a collaboration with Julian Huxley in 1920.

Sexton's genetic work on the genetics of G. chevreuxi eye colour was presented as the textbook example of Mendelian inheritance in E. B. Ford's classic monograph "Mendelism and Evolution". However, Sexton herself is not acknowledged by Ford in that book.

Sexton made illustrations of carvings from Papua New Guinea for the book published by her friend Reverend John Henry Hamilton. Hamilton gave Elsie and Louis Sexton his collection of ethnographic artifacts, and these were later sold by E. W. Sexton to the British Museum and the Liverpool Museum.

== Death ==
Sexton's daughter Mary A. F. Sexton had died in 1951, so in 1957 Sexton moved to Sussex to be with her son Colonel F. B. W. Sexton. She died on 18 February 1959 at Alfriston, Sussex, aged 90.

== Etymology ==
The crustacean genus Sextonia was named in her honour in 1930.

== Gallery ==
Arcturus polaris by Elsie Wilkins Sexton published in the British Museum's report on the collections of natural history made in the Antarctic regions during the voyage of the Southern Cross.

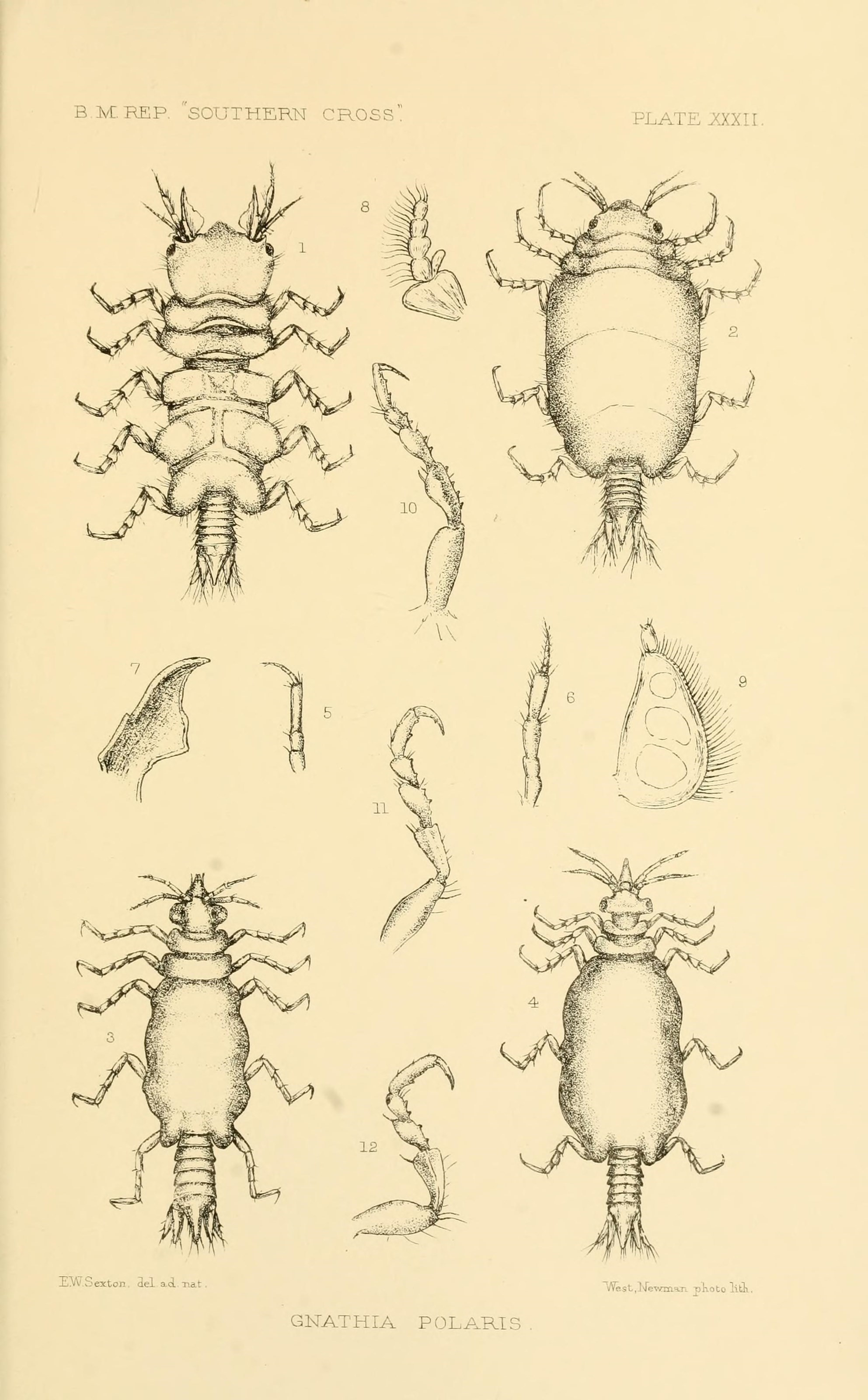
Report on the collections of natural history made in the Antarctic regions during the voyage of the "Southern Cross." (Plate XXXII) (8598039810)

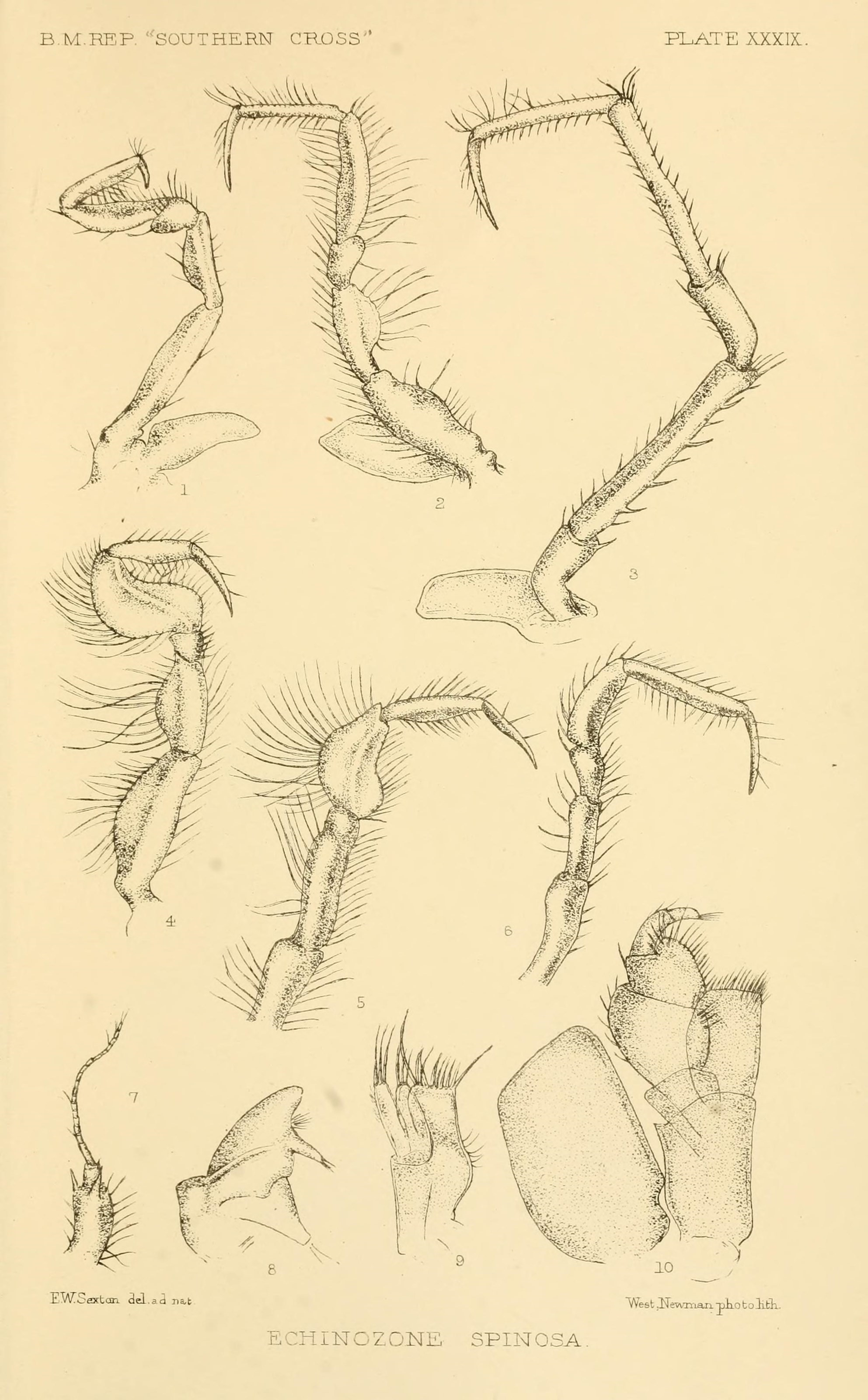
Report on the collections of natural history made in the Antarctic regions during the voyage of the "Southern Cross." (Plate XXXIX) (8596939003)

== Selected bibliography ==
- Sexton, E. W. (1908). "On the Amphipod Genus Trischizostoma". Proceedings of the Zoological Society of London. 78 (2): 370–402. doi:10.1111/j.1096-3642.1908.tb01849.x.
- Sexton, E. W. (1909). "Notes on some Amphipoda from the North Side of the Bay of Biscay. Families Pleustidie and Eusitridae". Proceedings of the Zoological Society of London. 79 (4): 848–879. doi:10.1111/j.1469-7998.1910.tb06975.x.
- Sexton, E. W. (1911). "On the Amphipod Genus Leptocheirus". Proceedings of the Zoological Society of London. 8 (3): 561–594. doi:10.1111/j.1096-3642.1911.tb01948.x.
- Sexton, E.W. (1911). "A new Amphipod species, Tryphosites alleni". The Annals and Magazine of Natural History: Including Zoology, Botany, and Geology. 7 (8): 510–513. doi:10.1080/00222931108692971.
