= Gammarus hoonsooi =

Scientific classification
- Kingdom: Animalia
- Phylum: Arthropoda
- Clade: Pancrustacea
- Class: Malacostraca
- Order: Amphipoda
- Family: Gammaridae
- Genus: Gammarus
- Species: G. hoonsooi

Binomial name
- Gammarus hoonsooi Lee, 1986

Species of crustacean

Gammarus hoonsooi is a fresh water amphipod in the genus Gammarus in the family Gammaridae, in the order Gammaridea. It was first described by Kyung Sook Lee in 1986.

This amphipod is endemic to the freshwaters of Korea, where it is found in the lower reaches of the river valleys of Andong, Gyeongsangbuk-do.
