= Dikerogammarus haemobaphes =

Scientific classification
- Kingdom: Animalia
- Phylum: Arthropoda
- Class: Malacostraca
- Order: Amphipoda
- Family: Gammaridae
- Genus: Dikerogammarus
- Species: D. haemobaphes

Binomial name
- Dikerogammarus haemobaphes (Eichwald, 1841)

Species of crustacean

Dikerogammarus haemobaphes is a species of freshwater gammarid crustacean. These gammarids are commonly known as demon shrimp, likely because they are an extremely successful invasive species.

Native to the Ponto Caspian basin, Dikerogammarus haemobaphes expanded their range in 1955. This expansion began in Lake Balaton, Hungary and then spread into certain rivers and lakes in Austria, Belgium, Germany, Poland, Russia, Ukraine, and the United Kingdom. These crustaceans were probably able to broaden their range due to the interconnection of waterways in Europe and the use of transportation vectors such as boats and ships.

== Identification ==
Dikerogammarus haemobaphes have a semi-transparent, white body consisting of a head, thorax, and abdomen. Their body consists of seven segments, each with a pair of pereopods (walking legs). These shrimp are different from other gammarid species as their peduncle, flagellum of antennae, and gnathopods have short bristles rather than long ones. Males average 16 mm in length, but can grow up to 21 mm. Females range between 7-15 mm long.

== Habitat preferences ==
Dikerogammarus haemobaphes have a wide salinity tolerance and are able to live in fresh and brackish water. They are also considered a eurythermal species, because they can tolerate a wide range of thermal temperatures.

Demon shrimp feed on sediments, detritus, unicellular and filamentous algae, and small crustaceans. These shrimp prefer living in coarse-grained cobble substrates, but can be found in all types of substrate. Demon shrimp are also commonly found in the same environment as Dreissena polymorpha, or zebra mussels. It has been found that Dikerogammarus haemobaphes prefer living on top of zebra mussel shells rather than other substrate types.

== Invasiveness ==
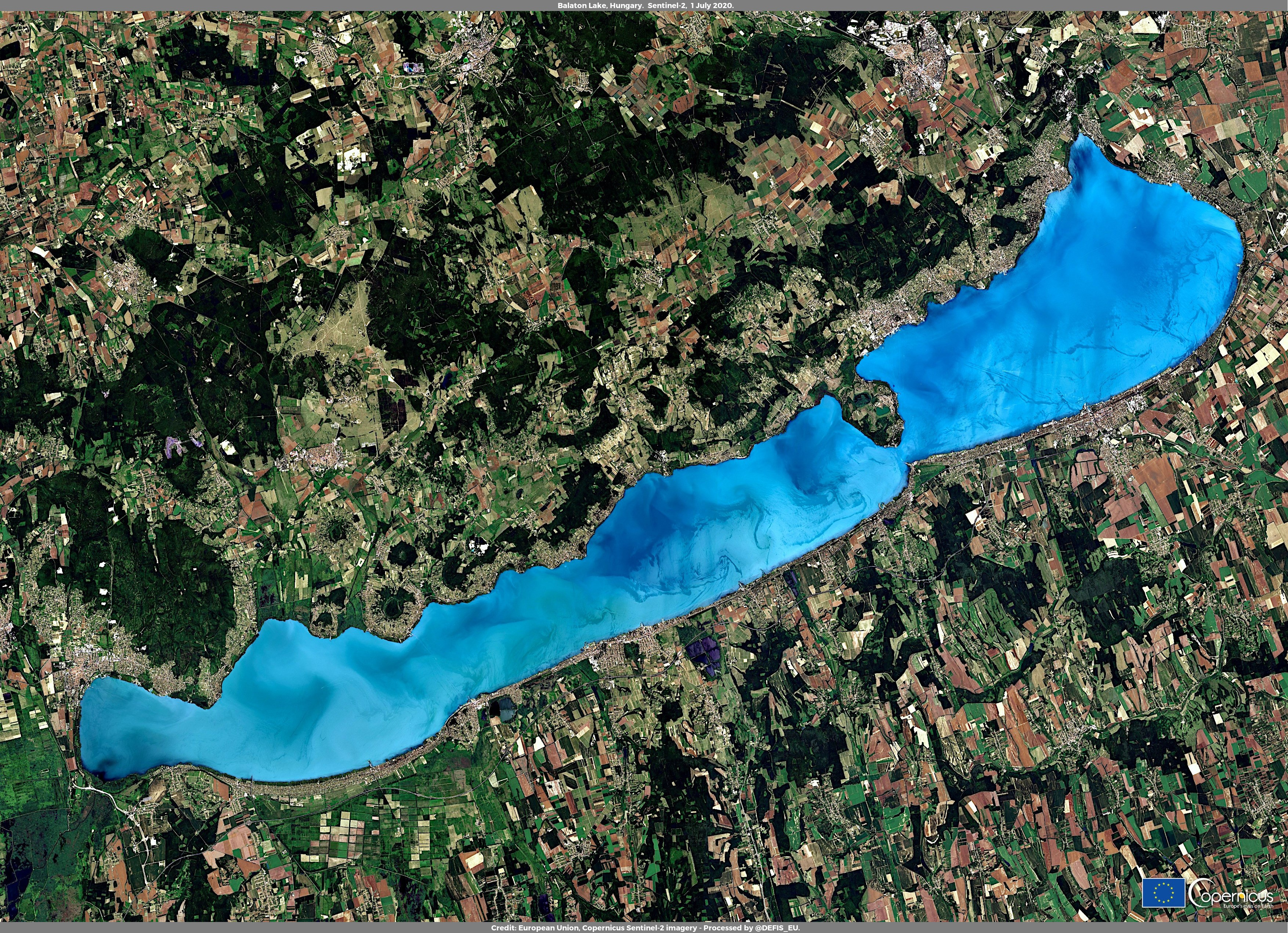
The first known invasion of Dikerogammarus haemobaphes was in Lake Balaton, Hungary in 1955.

The invasion of Dikerogammarus haemobaphes has been shown to harm their new habitat. Demon shrimp are highly successful invaders due to their rapid growth rates and early maturation. They also have a much higher fecundity than native gammarid species, enabling them to increase their population quickly. Their wide salinity tolerance, sediment preferences, and thermal tolerance also makes them able to successfully invade foreign ecosystems.

Amphipods play a major role in the energy flow within their environment due to their shredding and decomposition activities. Dikerogammarus haemobaphes has been reported to have lower detrital processing efficiency than native amphipod shrimp such as Gammarus pulex, so that a shift in the dominant amphipod species would lead to slower decomposition rates within the environment. Consequently if the demon shrimp take over a particular environment, the energy flow would be altered, causing deleterious effects on that particular niche. Since leaf shredding provides fresh and brackish water ecosystems with carbon and organic matter, a decrease in shredding activities would cause these levels to drop.

In addition to feeding on detritus, Demon shrimp also prey on native shrimp and insect species, having a significant impact on community dynamics, disrupting local food chains, and altering ecosystem function. The demon shrimp's omnivorous diet provides it with more available food sources, giving it an advantage over native gammarid species. The wide habitat breadth, carnivorous activities, high fecundity, and rapid growth of Dikerogammarus haemobaphes makes this species an extremely successful invader.
