= Gammarus chevreuxi =

Scientific classification
- Domain: Eukaryota
- Kingdom: Animalia
- Phylum: Arthropoda
- Class: Malacostraca
- Order: Amphipoda
- Family: Gammaridae
- Genus: Gammarus
- Species: G. chevreuxi

Binomial name
- Gammarus chevreuxi Sexton, 1913

Species of crustacean

Gammarus chevreuxi is a species of amphipod in the family Gammaridae. It was first described by Elsie Wilkins Sexton in 1913. The organism is very similar to Gammarus locusta, but there are certain constant characteristic which set it apart, for example, the antennae, the fourth side-plates and the third uropods. It is found in various places in England, such as the Severn Estuary, and in Portugal.

== Eyes and heredity ==
The eyes of G. chevreuxi are made up of black facets separated by white pigment. A mutation causes red facets. The recessive nature of the gene means that red-eyed populations breed true, being homozygous, while heterozygous black eyed populations may have either red-eyed or black-eyed offspring, in an illustration of Mendel's law of segregation.

Correspondingly the white pigment separating the facets maybe missing by another mutation. This characteristic is inherited independently of the colour of the facets, illustrating Mendel's law of independent assortment.
