= Gammarus bousfieldi =

Conservation status
- Vulnerable (IUCN 2.3)

Scientific classification
- Kingdom: Animalia
- Phylum: Arthropoda
- Class: Malacostraca
- Order: Amphipoda
- Family: Gammaridae
- Genus: Gammarus
- Species: G. bousfieldi

Binomial name
- Gammarus bousfieldi Cole and Minckley, 1961

Species of crustacean

Gammarus bousfieldi is a species of crustacean in family Gammaridae. It is endemic to the United States.
