= Gammarus baysali =

Scientific classification
- Domain: Eukaryota
- Kingdom: Animalia
- Phylum: Arthropoda
- Class: Malacostraca
- Order: Amphipoda
- Family: Gammaridae
- Genus: Gammarus
- Species: G. baysali

Binomial name
- Gammarus baysali Özbek, Yurga & Kulköyluoglu, 2013

Species of arthropod

Gammarus baysali is a cave-dwelling species of freshwater amphipod crustacean, found in Turkey. The species belongs to the broader Gammarus pulex group and was scientifically described in 2013 from Cumayanı Cave, Zonguldak Province.

The most discriminant characters of this species are the minute eyes, densely setose fifth peduncle and flagellar segments of antenna 2, elongated pereiopods, and setose anterior margins of pereiopods 5 to 7. Additionally, the palp of right maxilla 1 has 4 setae along its outer margin.
