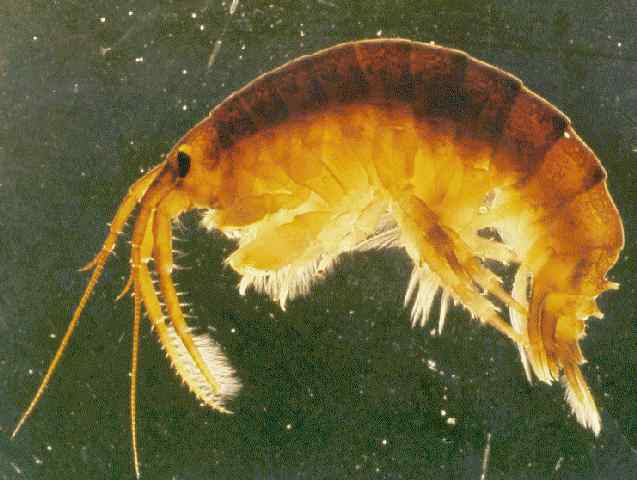

Scientific classification
- Kingdom: Animalia
- Phylum: Arthropoda
- Clade: Pancrustacea
- Class: Malacostraca
- Order: Amphipoda
- Family: Gammaridae
- Genus: Dikerogammarus
- Species: D. villosus

Binomial name
- Dikerogammarus villosus (Sowinsky, 1894)

= Dikerogammarus villosus =

Species of crustacean

Dikerogammarus villosus, also known as the killer shrimp, is a species of amphipod crustacean native to the Ponto-Caspian region of eastern Europe, but which has become invasive across the western part of the continent. In the areas it has invaded, it lives in a wide range of habitats and will prey on many other animals. It is fast-growing, reaching sexual maturity in 4–8 weeks. As it has moved through Europe, it threatens other species and has already displaced both native amphipods and previous invaders.

== Description ==
A diagram showing the typical anatomical features of an amphipod

D. villosus can grow up to 30 millimetres (1.2 in) in length, relatively large for a freshwater amphipod. It varies in appearance, with some specimens being striped, and some not. It has relatively large mandibles which allow it to be an effective predator.

== Distribution ==
D. villosus was originally found in the lower courses of large rivers in the Black Sea and Caspian Sea drainage basins. It has become an invasive species across central and western Europe, using the Danube river and its tributaries in its expansion. It is thought to have first escaped from the Danube in 1992 when the Rhine–Main–Danube Canal was opened and has since spread to nearly all the major rivers in western Europe, including the Rhône, Loire, Seine, Moselle, Meuse, Rhine and Main, as well as the Baltic Sea. It is unknown how the species is dispersed but it is probably related to shipping activity. It spread quickly through western Europe; found in the Rhine at the German–Dutch border (1995), the canals and rivers of northern Germany (1998), the Baltic Szczecin Lagoon (2001), the Moselle (2001), the Netherlands (2002), Lake Constance (2003), Lake Leman, the Rhine in France (2003), the Grand Canal d'Alsace (2003) and Lake Garda (2003). Its spread is thought to be related to the previous introduction of the zebra mussel, Dreissena polymorpha which it has evolved alongside. In September 2010, it was found in Grafham Water in Cambridgeshire, the first report of the species in the United Kingdom and it was found in Wales in November 2010. In March 2023, it was found in Vättern in Sweden and it is the first time it is encountered in the northernmost part of Europe.

There are fears that it could spread to the Great Lakes in North America in future, carried in the ballast water of ships.

== Ecology ==
In its natural range, D. villosus is not the most abundant species of amphipod and it does not behave as aggressively as it does in areas it has invaded.

=== Habitat ===
D. villosus can colonise many types of habitat as it is able to tolerate a wide range of temperatures (0–30 °C or 32–86 °F), low oxygen concentrations, and salinity up to 20‰. It is found in lakes, canals and rivers living in a range of substrates. When found in lotic environments, the species prefers habitats with relatively mild currents. It is thought that zebra mussels change habitats by increasing the amount of benthic organic matter, which benefits D. villosus helping them to outcompete other species. When given a choice, D. villosus spend more time feeding around zebra mussel shells than a bare substrate.

=== Feeding ===
D. villosus is omnivorous and feeds on a variety of invertebrates, including other members of the Gammaridae family. It has been found to kill blue-tailed damselfly nymphs, water hoglice, water boatman, fish leeches as well as small fish and the eggs of other vertebrates. D. villosus sometimes kills prey but does not eat it; it kills its prey by biting it with its large mandibles and then shreds it before eating it. D. villosus also consumes many other forms of food, including grazing on biofilms, consuming plant detritus, eating and re-digesting feces, and feeding on organic matter and algae suspended in the water column.

=== Growth and reproduction ===
D. villosus breeds all year round so long as the water temperature is above 13 °C (55 °F). When they mate, the female is carried on the ventral side of the male. Each pair produces an average of 27 eggs, but up to 50 eggs can be laid. The young animals become sexually mature in 4 to 8 weeks, once they are 6 mm in length and after moulting several times. They are fast-growing, during winter increasing by 1.3–2.9 mm in length per month and by 2.0–2.6 mm every two weeks in spring. Populations are predominantly female.

== Parasites ==
Cucumispora dikerogammari infects D. villosus after their ranges overlapped, C. dikerogammari reduces the survival rate in infected D. villosus during the later stages of infection, leading them to reproduce earlier and there is evidence to suggest that C. dikerogammari may cause imbalance to the male/female sex ratio in the infected D. villosus

== Effects on other species ==
In the Netherlands, D. villosus is threatening the native amphipod species Gammarus duebeni, as well as Gammarus tigrinus which had previously become invasive after previously being introduced from North America. It is thought to have displaced two other species of Dikerogammarus (D. bispinosus and D. haemobaphes) which were previously invasive in the Danube. Its ability to attack and feed on a range of species could cause the local extinction of some species.
