= Gammarus katagani =

Scientific classification
- Domain: Eukaryota
- Kingdom: Animalia
- Phylum: Arthropoda
- Class: Malacostraca
- Order: Amphipoda
- Family: Gammaridae
- Genus: Gammarus
- Species: G. katagani

Binomial name
- Gammarus katagani Özbek, 2012

Species of crustacean

Gammarus katagani is a species of freshwater amphipod, collected from Domaniç in Kütahya Province, Turkey. This species belongs to the Gammarus balcanicus group. The presence of an additional row of setae on the last two meta-some segments in both sexes is the most diagnostic character for the species.
