= Gammarus insensibilis =

Scientific classification
- Domain: Eukaryota
- Kingdom: Animalia
- Phylum: Arthropoda
- Class: Malacostraca
- Order: Amphipoda
- Family: Gammaridae
- Genus: Gammarus
- Species: G. insensibilis

Binomial name
- Gammarus insensibilis Stock, 1966

Species of crustacean

Gammarus insensibilis, the lagoon sand shrimp, is a species of amphipod crustacean found in coastal lagoons. It grows to 20 mm (0.79 in) long.
