= Gammarus obruki =

Scientific classification
- Kingdom: Animalia
- Phylum: Arthropoda
- Class: Malacostraca
- Order: Amphipoda
- Family: Gammaridae
- Genus: Gammarus
- Species: G. obruki

Binomial name
- Gammarus obruki Özbek, 2012

Species of crustacean

Gammarus obruki is a species of freshwater amphipod, collected from İnderesi Cave, Bartın Province, Turkey. This species belongs to the Gammarus pulex-group. The most discriminant characters of this species are the presence of prolonged extremities, including a very long antennae, up to 52 segmented flagella, a densely setose fifth peduncle, l flagellar segments of antenna, and a fourth peduncle segment that has no long setae.
