= G. mucronatus =

G. mucronatus may refer to:

- Gammarus mucronatus, a species of scud
- Griffithides mucronatus, junior synonym of Paladin mucronatus, a species of trilobite
