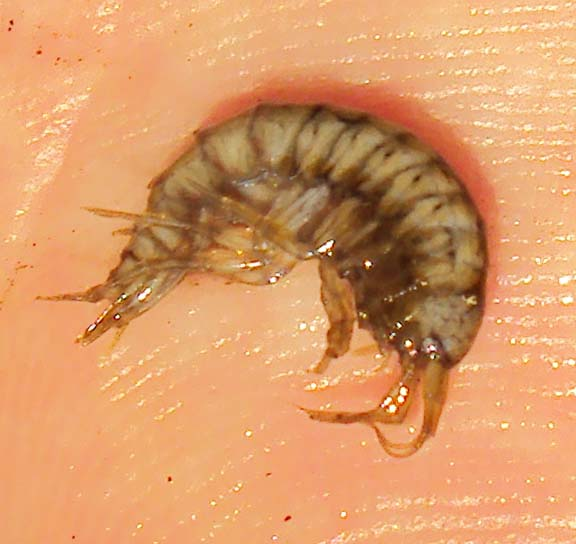
- Gammarus fossarum

Scientific classification
- Kingdom: Animalia
- Phylum: Arthropoda
- Clade: Pancrustacea
- Class: Malacostraca
- Order: Amphipoda
- Family: Gammaridae
- Genus: Gammarus
- Species: G. fossarum

Binomial name
- Gammarus fossarum (Koch, 1836)

Synonyms
- Rivulogammarus fossarum (Straskraba, 1967) [nom. inval.]

= Gammarus fossarum =

Species of crustacean

Gammarus fossarum is a species complex of freshwater amphipod crustacean native to Europe. They are abundant members of the macroinvertebrate community, and also used as model organisms for ecotoxicology.

== Description ==
Gammarus fossarum go through nine or ten moults of their exoskeleton before reaching sexual maturity; weighing just 0.1 mg at birth, by adulthood they have a wet weight of 5 to 7 mg. Adult G. fossarum are between 4.5 and 10 mm in length, and weigh up to 41 (females) to 61 (males) mg wet weight.

== Distribution ==
Gammarus fossarum are widely distributed throughout central and southeastern Europe. They are found in France, Italy, Germany, Switzerland, Austria, Slovenia, Serbia, the Netherlands, Belgium, Hungary, Croatia, Albania, Bulgaria, and Bosnia and Herzegovina.

It was previously thought to be a single species based on morphological characteristics, however genetic and genomic research has revealed additional diversity within G. fossarum. Mitochondrial DNA showed that there were three distinct clades in central Europe, subsequently called types A, B, and C. More recent population genetic analyses on amphipods from across the entire distribution range of G. fossarum have revealed that it is in fact a species complex of at least 80 cryptic species. Thesee analyses found at least six major clades, located in Central Western Europe (CWE), Central Eastern Europe (CEE), South Eastern Europe (SEE), France and Central Europe (CRA-CE-A), Eastern Europe (EE-Q), and Central Europe (CE-B). The clades diverged at least 20 million years ago, during the Miocene. Populations can be highly differentiated even at the regional and local scales due to genetic drift.

Gammarus fossarum are now found also outside their native range. They were detected in the United Kingdom using environmental DNA sampling in 2015.

== Ecology ==
Gammarus fossarum prefer flowing, well-oxygenated water and are often found in smaller and mid-sized streams, particularly in hilly and mountainous areas. They can be found in densities up to hundreds of individuals per square meter.

Gammarus fossarum are omnivorous. They are known for their shredding of leaf litter detritus that enters streams and waterways from the surrounding forest, but G. fossarum also feed on other macroinvertebrates. In many locations, G. fossarum co-occur with other amphipod species, and the species engage in intraguild predation. G. fossarum are prey for larger aquatic animals, such as fish.

Before mating, male and female G. fossarum form precopulatory pairs and move together in their environments. This behavior lasts for several days and both males and large females have some element of mate choice.

Gammarus fossarum are parasitized by a number of taxa, including acanthocephalans.

== Use in ecotoxicology ==
Gammarus fossarum are a common animal to use in bioassessment and ecotoxicology. Their survival, growth, reproduction, activity levels, physiology, and food consumption are used as indicators of environmental conditions, including acidity, nanoparticles, wastewater effluent, pesticides, and pharmaceuticals.
