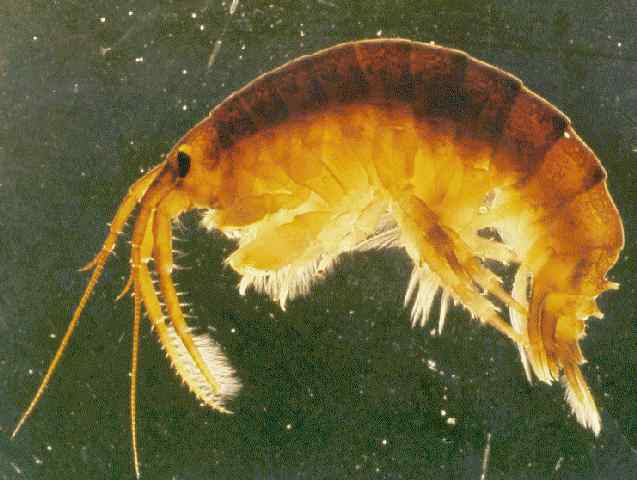
- Dikerogammarus villosus

Scientific classification
- Domain: Eukaryota
- Kingdom: Animalia
- Phylum: Arthropoda
- Class: Malacostraca
- Order: Amphipoda
- Family: Gammaridae
- Genus: Dikerogammarus; Stebbing, 1899

Species
- 10 recognized species, see article.

= Dikerogammarus =

Genus of crustaceans

Dikerogammarus is a genus of amphipod crustaceans, containing the following species:

- Dikerogammarus aralychensis (Birstein, 1932)
- Dikerogammarus batalonicus Ponyi, 1955
- Dikerogammarus bispinosus Martynov, 1925
- Dikerogammarus caspius (Pallas, 1771)
- Dikerogammarus fluviatilis Martynov, 1919
- Dikerogammarus gruberi Mateus & Mateus, 1990
- Dikerogammarus haemobaphes (Eichwald, 1841)
- Dikerogammarus istanbulensis Özbek & Özkan, 2011
- Dikerogammarus oskari Birstein, 1945
- Dikerogammarus villosus (Sowinsky, 1894)
