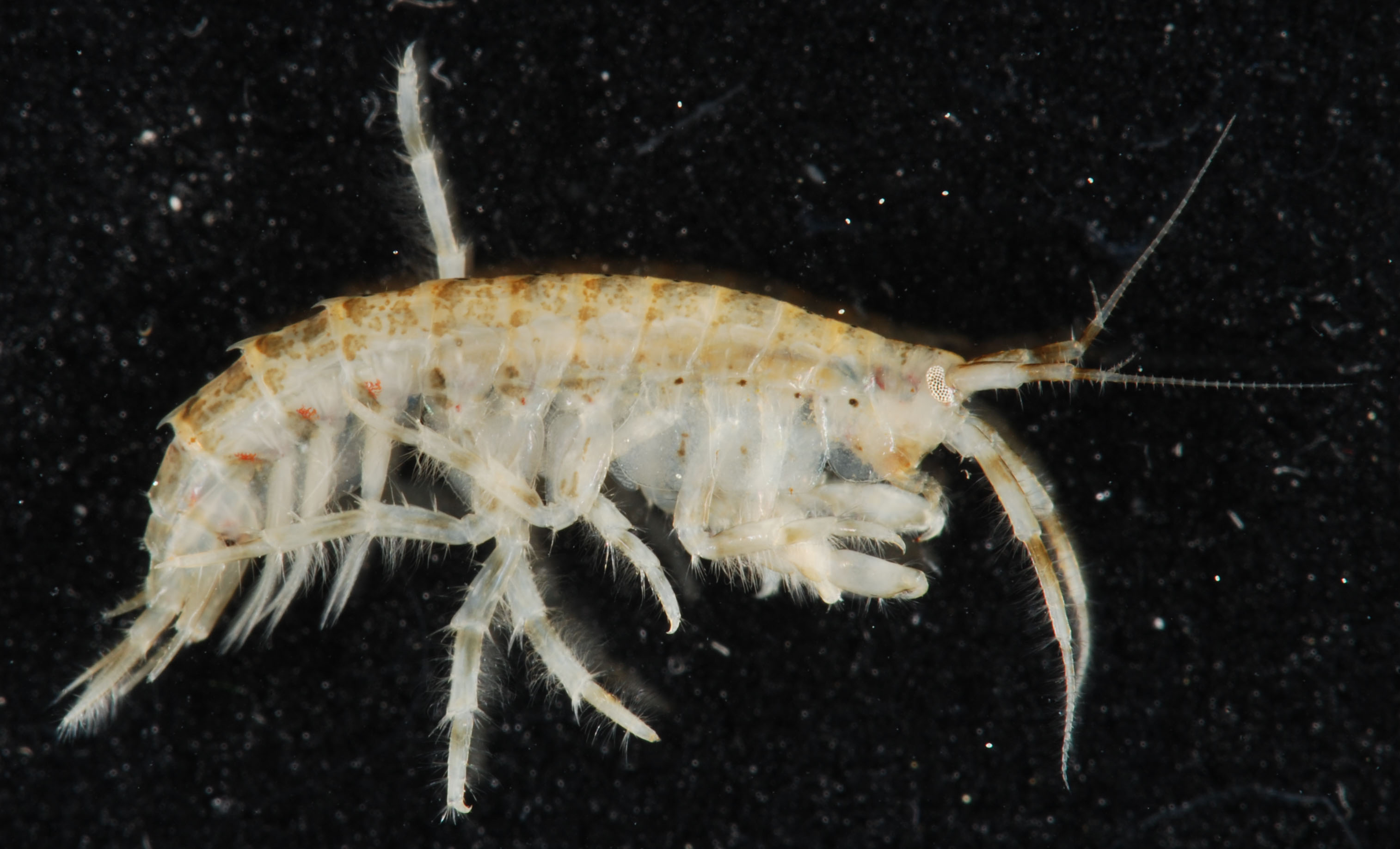

Scientific classification
- Kingdom: Animalia
- Phylum: Arthropoda
- Clade: Pancrustacea
- Class: Malacostraca
- Order: Amphipoda
- Family: Gammaridae
- Genus: Gammarus
- Species: G. mucronatus

Binomial name
- Gammarus mucronatus (Say, 1818)

= Gammarus mucronatus =

Species of crustacean

Gammarus mucronatus is a species of scud in the family Gammaridae. It is found in the coasts of the North American Atlantic seaboard and the Gulf of Mexico.

== Phylogenetics ==
Gammarus mucronatus is part of the Arthropod phylum: it has an external skeleton - or cuticle - with a body made up of articulated segments-bearers of appendages which are themselves articulated, and a growth by molting. More specifically, G. mucronatus is a Malacostraca, which is the monophyletic group of the superior crustaceans. Malacostraca are subdivided in three subclasses: Phyllocarida, Hoplocarida and Eumalacostraca. Like the vast majority of the Malacostraca, G. mucronatus belongs to the Eumalacostraca and more specifically to the Peracarida. This superorder is characterized by the presence of a marsupium (an abdominal sac sheltering the eggs) formed by the oostegites, the flat and flared parts of the proximal segments of the legs. G. mucronatus belongs to the Amphipods, an order of the Peracarida, defined by the two kinds of legs that they possess. G. mucronatus belongs to the Gammaridae family. More specifically, the species of Gammarus mucronatus was described for the first time in 1818.

== Etymology ==
Pierre-André Latreille (1762-1833), an important French entomologist specialized in the taxonomy of arthropods, coined the term Amphipoda in 1816. It comes from the Greek: amphi = on either side, and pode = leg. It is an allusion to the apparent distribution of the legs in 2 groups one directed towards the front (used to cling to the substrate and grasp the food) and the other towards the rear (ambulatory or swimming legs). This term is coined in opposition to the Isopoda, another order of the Peracarida, which only present a single type of leg. Pierre-André Latreille also coined the term Gammaridae, which describes the family of Gammarus mucronatus.

== Morphology ==
Gammarus mucronatus is relatively small: organisms’ size varies between 3.5 and 6.5 mm. That size seems to remain stable between habitats. However, a reduction in size of ovigerous and mature females from the winter months to the summer has been observed. G. mucronatus has no carapace and a laterally compressed body, which is a synapomorphy of the Amphipods.

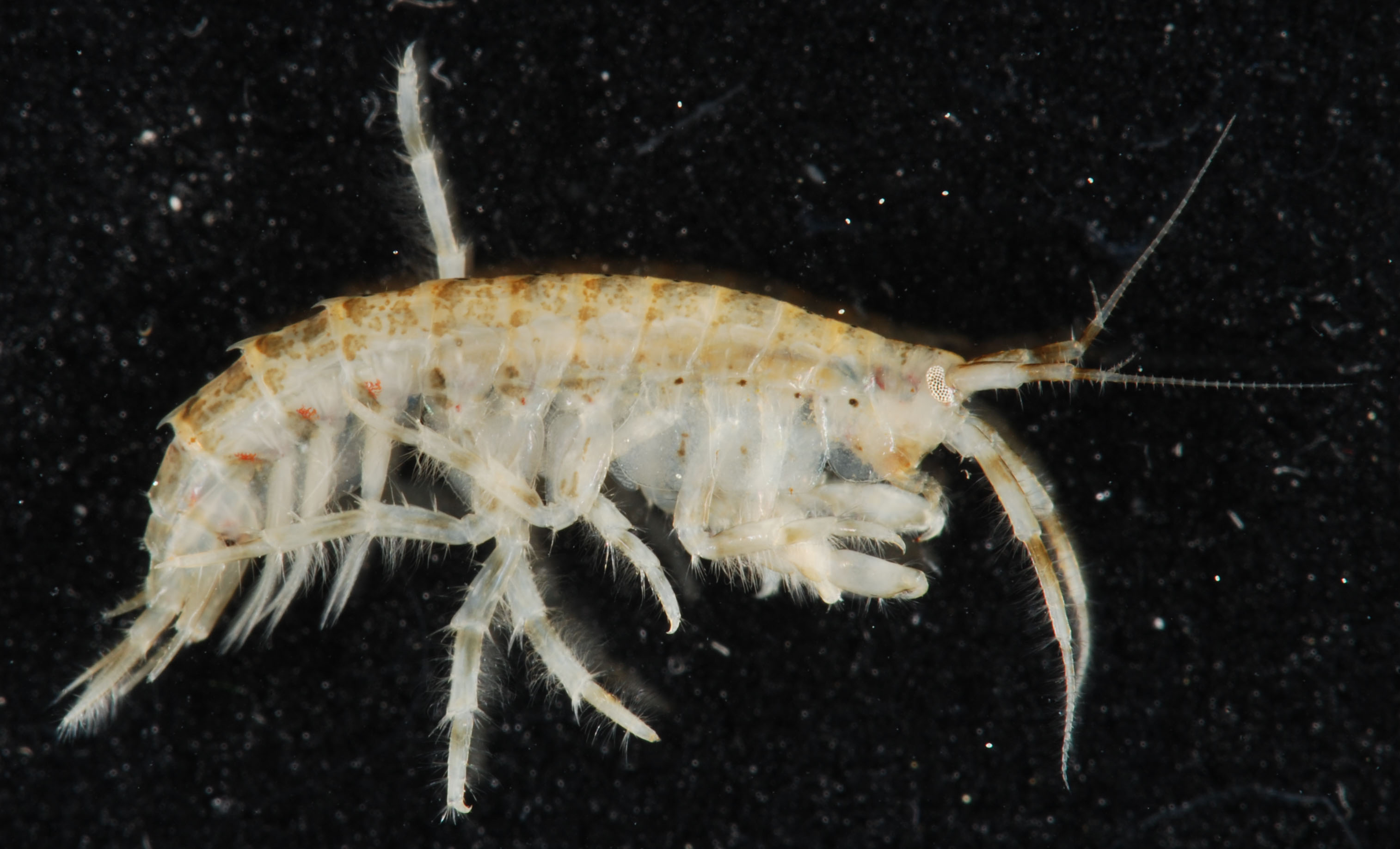
Gammarus mucronatus

== Habitat ==
Gammarus mucronatus is eurytopic, which means that it is capable of tolerating a wide range of ecological conditions. For example, it can withstand a wide range of salinity levels from 4 to 35‰. It is generally found in the endemic shallow waters and coasts of the North American Atlantic seaboard and the Gulf of Mexico. It is therefore found in very different habitat: algae, grass beds, sponges, spartina marshes, soft bottoms with shells or cobbles, oysters bar and open beaches. It is a benthic organism, which means that it lives at the bottom of the water.

== Life history ==
Sex are differentiated between females and males. Brood development lasts a mean of 31 days. The females are multivoltine, which means they have several broods in one season. That means that there is several cohorts of Gammarus mucronatus, which sometimes overlap. Winter and summer populations of G. mucronatus have different reproduction strategies, with the summer population having reduced egg size, brood size, development time, size at maturity, and maximum size. The mean cohort interval is 112 days and its mean turnover rate is 4.3. Most of the mature females are ovigerous. Each female produces between 3 and 200 eggs. That production depends on the female's size: the bigger a female is, the more eggs she will produce. There is also a variation in the egg's size from 0.308 to 0.532 mm. The egg size varies seasonally, decreasing from winter to summer. The density of the G. mucronatus population peaks in late June.

== Ecology ==
Gammarus mucronatus has a diversified diet: it is detritivore but also eats microalgae and macroalgae, and possibly some other macrofauna. It lacks the enzymatic activity towards structural plant polysaccharides. However, G. mucronatus can break down the glycosidic linkages in smaller molecules. It can process starch and laminarin.

In seagrass beds, G. mucronatus may have different ecological roles. It participates in the decomposition process and also engage in grazing of sea grass epiphytes. Moreover, large decapods, crustaceans, juvenile and adult fishes prey on G. mucronatus, like the stripped killfish, Fundulus majalis. The activity of those predators depends on the presence or the absence of some organisms in the habitat of G. mucronatus. The presence of macroalgua reduces the predation of G. mucronatus by fish, which directly has a positive effect on their population’ size and could create ternate stable states.
