= Gmelina (crustacean) =

Scientific classification
- Kingdom: Animalia
- Phylum: Arthropoda
- Class: Malacostraca
- Order: Amphipoda
- Family: Gammaridae
- Genus: Gmelina; G. O. Sars, 1894

Genus of crustaceans

Gmelina is a genus of amphipods of the family Gammaridae. They are found in the brackish water habitats of the Caspian and Black Seas.

== Species ==
There are two recognized species:

- Gmelina aestuarica Carausu, 1943
- Gmelina costata G. O. Sars, 1894

Some species originally included in this genus are now placed in Kuzmelina and Yogmelina.
