= Neogammarus =

Scientific classification
- Kingdom: Animalia
- Phylum: Arthropoda
- Clade: Pancrustacea
- Class: Malacostraca
- Order: Amphipoda
- Family: Gammaridae
- Genus: Neogammarus; Karaman, 1969

Synonyms
- Neogammarus Ruffo, 1937; Rhipidogammarus Stock, 1971

Genus of amphipods

Neogammarus is a genus of amphipods described by Sandro Ruffo in 1937.

== Taxonomy ==
Neogammarus was originally described by Ruffo in 1937, but a type species was not designated, which made it an unavailable name. The name remained unavailable until Gammarus rhipidiophorus was designated as the type species in 1969 by Gordan S. Karaman. The same species was also designated as the type species of the genus Rhipidogammarus in 1971. That these two genera had the same type species made them objective taxonomic synonyms. Consequently, Rhipidogammarus was synonymised to Neogammarus in 2023.

== Species ==
The following species are assigned to this genus:

- Neogammarus adriaticus Karaman, 1973
- Neogammarus gordankaramani (Özbek & Sket, 2020)
- Neogammarus karamani (Stock, 1971)
- Neogammarus rhipidiophorus (Catta, 1878)
