= Cucumispora dikerogammari =

Scientific classification
- Kingdom: Fungi
- Division: Rozellomycota
- Class: Microsporidia
- Family: Nosematidae
- Genus: Cucumispora
- Species: C. dikerogammari

Binomial name
- Cucumispora dikerogammari (Ovcharenko and Vita, 1985)

Species of fungus

The microsporidian Cucumispora dikerogammari is a parasitic fungal species that infects the invasive amphipod Dikerogammarus villosus. The first recorded evidence of Cucumispora dikerogammari was, as cited by Ovcharenko and Vita, in Germany, circa 1895, by Dr. L. Pfeiffer in the Dnieper Estuary. The Dnieper Estuary and lower parts of the Danube River are considered to be the parasite’s native range. As its host, D. villosus, began to invade novel habitats, C. dikerogammari followed, and has now expanded its range to be found in many of the main bodies of water in Central and Western Europe. At this time, only limited research has been conducted regarding the ecological implications of C. dikerogammari spreading beyond its native range. However, there is evidence to suggest that C. dikerogammari may cause imbalance to the male/female sex ratio of its host D. villosus.

== Classification ==
Toward the broader end of its classification, C. dikerogammari falls within the phylum Microsporidia. Characteristics of phylum Microspora include a relictual mitochondrial structure and a complex life cycle involving both horizontal and vertical transmission. These characteristics suggest a host organism is necessary to sustain life and allow for reproduction of Microsporidia. The parasite was originally classified as Nosema dikerogammari. Through phenotypic, molecular, phylogenic, and host compatibility experiments, evidence has led to the reclassification of Nosema dikerogammari within the novel genus Cucumispora. Characteristics that define both genus Cucumispora and Nosema are diplokaryotic development and disporoblastic sporogony. Ovcharenko instated the novel genus Cucumispora to describe the presence a specific anterior structure to aid in attachment to a susceptible host, specific arrangements of isofilar polar filaments, substantial diplokaryon, and vacuole structure. These traits are unique to Cucumispora, and serve to differentiate it from Nosema.

== Host ==
Several microsporidian parasites are known to infect Dikerogammarus villosus. C. dikerogammari reduces the survival rate in its hosts during the later stages of infection, leading them to reproduce earlier.
