= Cucumispora =

Scientific classification
- Kingdom: Fungi
- Phylum: Rozellomycota
- Class: Microsporidia
- Family: Nosematidae
- Genus: Cucumispora

Species
- Cucumispora dikerogammari; Cucumispora ornata; Cucumispora roeselii

Genus of fungi

Cucumispora is a genus of microsporidians in the family Nosematidae.
