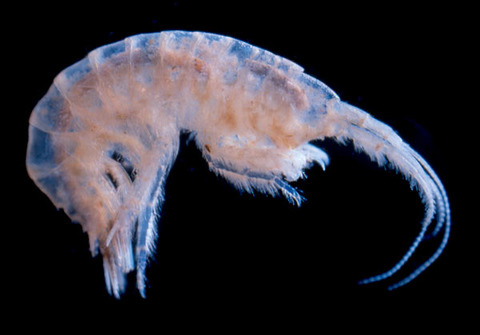

Conservation status
- Vulnerable (IUCN 2.3)

Scientific classification
- Kingdom: Animalia
- Phylum: Arthropoda
- Clade: Pancrustacea
- Class: Malacostraca
- Order: Amphipoda
- Family: Gammaridae
- Genus: Gammarus
- Species: G. pecos

Binomial name
- Gammarus pecos Cole & Bousfield, 1970

= Gammarus pecos =

Species of crustacean

Gammarus pecos, commonly known as the Pecos amphipod, is a species of crustacean in family Gammaridae. It is endemic to Pecos County, Texas in the United States, where it is known from only two locations: Diamond Y Spring (sometimes known as Wilbank Spring) and Leon Creek.

Gammarus pecos is classified as a vulnerable species by the IUCN Red List. A portion of the spring and cienega habitat inhabited by this species is now protected as part of the Diamond Y Spring Preserve, a nature reserve, owned by the Nature Conservancy.
