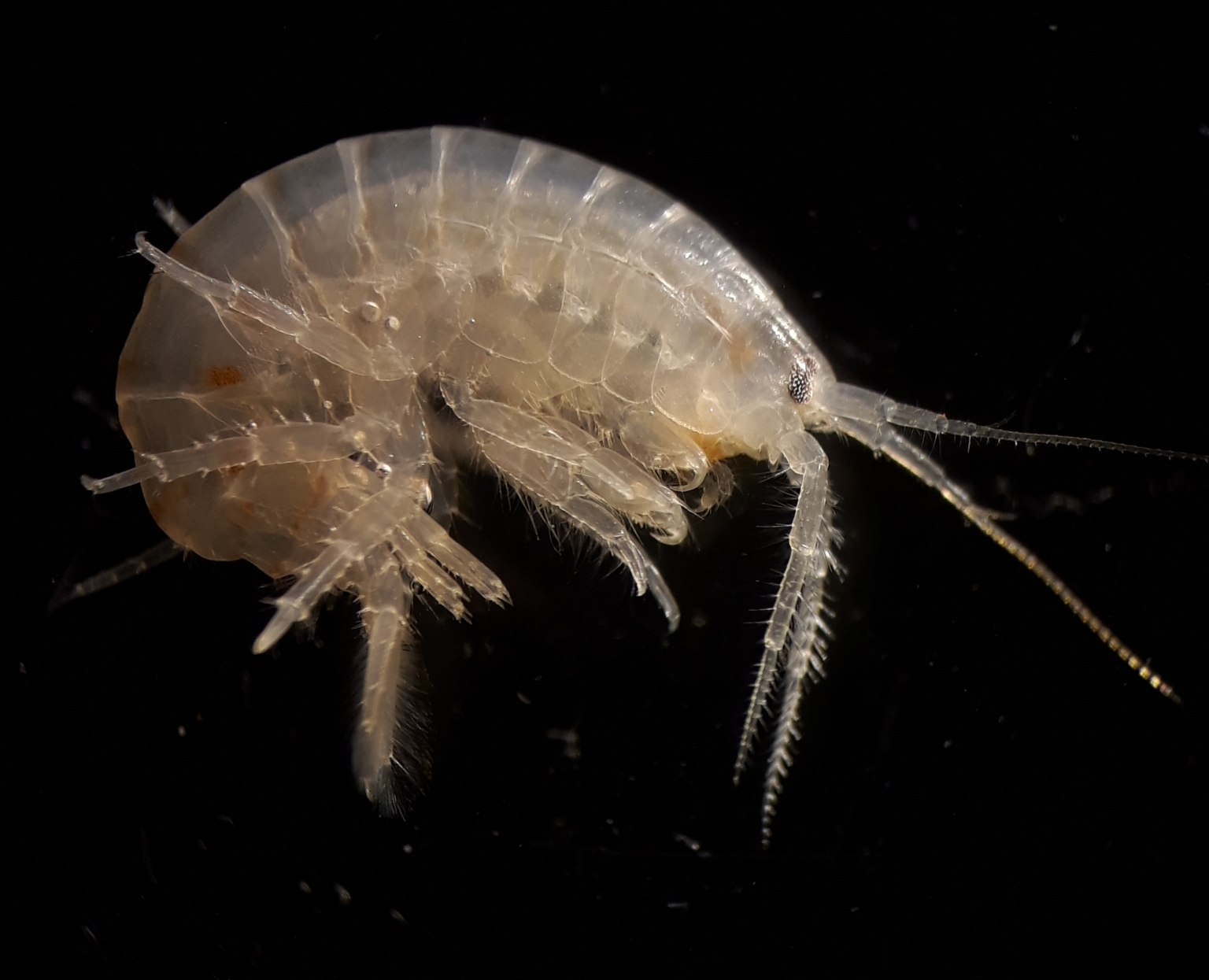
- Gammarus pulex

Scientific classification
- Kingdom: Animalia
- Phylum: Arthropoda
- Clade: Pancrustacea
- Class: Malacostraca
- Order: Amphipoda
- Family: Gammaridae
- Genus: Gammarus; Fabricius, 1775

Type species
- Gammarus pulex Linnaeus, 1758

Synonyms
- Rivulogammarus; Sinogammarus

= Gammarus =

Genus of crustaceans

Gammarus is an amphipod crustacean genus in the family Gammaridae. It contains more than 200 described species, making it one of the most species-rich genera of crustaceans. Different species have different optimal conditions, particularly in terms of salinity, and different tolerances; Gammarus pulex, for instance, is a purely freshwater species, while Gammarus locusta is estuarine, only living where the salinity is greater than 25‰.

Species of Gammarus are the typical "scuds" of North America and range widely throughout the Holarctic. A considerable number are also found southwards into the Northern Hemisphere tropics, particularly in Southeast Asia.

== Species ==
The following species are included: Four new species were found in 2018 on the Tibetan Plateau. Four more new species were described from the Chihuahuan Desert in 2021.

- Gammarus abscisus G. Karaman, 1973
- Gammarus abstrusus Hou, Platvoet & Li, 2006
- Gammarus acalceolatus Pinkster, 1970
- Gammarus accolae G. Karaman, 1973
- Gammarus accretus Hou & Li, 2002
- Gammarus acherondytes Hubricht & Mackins, 1940
- Gammarus aequicauda (Martynov, 1931)
- Gammarus agrarius G. Karaman, 1973
- Gammarus albimanus G. Karaman, 1968
- Gammarus alsaticus Van Straelen, 1924†
- Gammarus altus Hou & Li, 2018
- Gammarus anatoliensis Schellenberg, 1937
- Gammarus angulatus (Martynov, 1930)
- Gammarus angusticoxalis Martynov, 1935
- Gammarus annandalei (Monod, 1924)
- Gammarus annulatus Smith, 1873
- Gammarus anodon Stock, Mirzajani, Vonk, Naderi & Kiabi, 1998
- Gammarus aoculus Hou & Li, 2003
- Gammarus araxenius Derzhavin, 1938
- Gammarus arduus G. Karaman, 1975
- Gammarus argaeus Vávra, 1905
- Gammarus bakhteyaricus Khalayi-Pirbalanty & Sari, 2004
- Gammarus balcanicus Schaferna, 1922
- Gammarus barnaulensis Schellenberg, 1937
- Gammarus baysali Özbek et al., 2013
- Gammarus belli G. Karaman, 1984
- Gammarus bergi Martynov, 1930
- Gammarus birsteini Karaman & Pinkster, 1977
- Gammarus bosniacus Schäferna, 1922
- Gammarus bousfieldi Cole & Minckley, 1961
- Gammarus brevicornis (Martynov, 1935)
- Gammarus brevipodus Hou, Li & Platvoet, 2004
- Gammarus breviramus Bousfield & Elwood, 1971
- Gammarus bucharensis Martynov, 1935
- Gammarus caparti Petre-Stroobants, 1981
- Gammarus caucasicus Martynov, 1932
- Gammarus caudisetus Viviani, 1805
- Gammarus chaohuensis Hou & Li, 2002
- Gammarus chevreuxi Sexton, 1913
- Gammarus chimkenti G. Karaman, 1984
- Gammarus chostensis Martynov, 1932
- Gammarus cohabitus Hosinger, Shafer, Fong & Culver, 2008
- Gammarus colei Walters, Cannizzaro & Berg, 2021
- Gammarus comosus Hou, Li & Gao, 2005
- Gammarus craspedotrichus Hou & Li, 2002
- Gammarus crenulatus G. S. Karaman & Pinkster, 1977
- Gammarus crinicaudatus Stock, Mirzajani, Vonk, Naderi & Kiabi, 1998
- Gammarus crinicornis Stock, 1966
- Gammarus crispus Martynov, 1932
- Gammarus curvativus Hou & Li, 2003
- Gammarus dabanus Tachteew & Mekhanikova, 2000
- Gammarus daiberi Bousfield, 1969
- Gammarus decorosus Meng, Hou & Li, 2003
- Gammarus denticulatus Hou, Li & Morino, 2002
- Gammarus desperatus Cole, 1981
- Gammarus dorsosetosus Mateus & Mateus, 1990
- Gammarus duebeni Liljeborg, 1852
- Gammarus dulensis S. Karaman, 1929
- Gammarus edwardsi Bate, 1862
- Gammarus effultus G. Karaman, 1975
- Gammarus electrus Hou & Li, 2003
- Gammarus elevatus Hou, Li & Morino, 2002
- Gammarus elvirae Iannilli & Ruffo, 2002
- Gammarus emeiensis Hou, Li & Koenemann, 2002
- Gammarus fasciatus Say, 1818
- Gammarus finmarchicus Dahl, 1938
- Gammarus flabellifera Stimpson, 1856
- Gammarus fluviatilis Milne-Edwards, 1840†
- Gammarus fontinalis Costa, 1883
- Gammarus fossarum Koch, 1836
- Gammarus frater Karaman & Pinkster, 1977
- Gammarus frigidus Hou & Li, 2004
- Gammarus galgosensis Lee & Kim, 2004
- Gammarus galgosensis Lee & Kim, 1980
- Gammarus gauthieri (S. Karaman, 1935)
- Gammarus glabratus Hou & Li, 2003
- Gammarus goedmakersae G. S. Karaman & Pinkster, 1977
- Gammarus gonggaensis Hou & Li, 2018
- Gammarus gracilis Martynov, 1935
- Gammarus gregoryi Tattersall, 1924
- Gammarus halilicae G. Karaman, 1969
- Gammarus hegmatanensis Hekmatara, Sari & Baladehi, 2011
- Gammarus hirsutus Martynov, 1935
- Gammarus hongyuanensis Barnard & Dai, 1988
- Gammarus hoonsooi Lee, 1986
- Gammarus hyalelloides Cole, 1976
- Gammarus ibericus Margalef, 1951
- Gammarus inaequicauda Stock, 1966
- Gammarus inberbus Karaman & Pinkster, 1977
- Gammarus inopinatus Mateus & Mateus, 1990
- Gammarus insensibilis Stock, 1966
- Gammarus italicus Goedmakers & Pinkster, 1977
- Gammarus izmirensis Özbek, 2007
- Gammarus jacksoni Morino & Whitman, 1995
- Gammarus jaspidus Hou & Li, 2004
- Gammarus jenneri Bynum & Fox, 1977
- Gammarus kamtschaticus Tzvetkova, 1972
- Gammarus kangdingensis Hou & Li, 2018
- Gammarus kasymovi Aliev, 1997
- Gammarus katagani Özbek, 2012
- Gammarus kesanensis Özbek & Camur-Elipek, 2010
- Gammarus kesslerianus Martynov, 1931
- Gammarus kischineffensis Schellenberg, 1937
- Gammarus komareki (Schaferna, 1922)
- Gammarus korbuensis Martynov, 1930
- Gammarus koshovi Bazikalova, 1946
- Gammarus kunti Özbek, Baytaşoğlu & Aksu, 2023
- Gammarus kyonggiensis Lee & Seo, 1990
- Gammarus laborifer Karaman & Pinkster, 1977
- Gammarus lacustris G. O. Sars, 1864
- Gammarus langi Walters, Cannizzaro & Berg, 2021
- Gammarus lasaensis Barnard & Dai, 1988
- Gammarus laticoxalis Karaman & Pinkster, 1977
- Gammarus lawrencianus Bousfield, 1956
- Gammarus lecroyae Thoma & Heard, 2009
- Gammarus ledoyeri G. Karaman, 1987
- Gammarus lepoliensis Jazdzewski & Konopacka, 1989
- Gammarus lichuanensis Hou & Li, 2002
- Gammarus limnaeus S. I. smith, 1874
- Gammarus limosus Hou & Li, 2018
- Gammarus lobifer Stock, Mirzajani, Vonk, Naderi & Kiabi, 1998
- Gammarus locusta (Linnaeus, 1758)
- Gammarus longipedis Karaman & Pinkster, 1987
- Gammarus longisaeta Lee & Seo, 1992
- Gammarus lophacanthus Hou & Li, 2002
- Gammarus lordeganensis Khalayi-Pirbalanty & Sari, 2004
- Gammarus lychnidensis Schellenberg, 1943
- Gammarus macedonicus G. Karaman, 1976
- Gammarus madidus Hou & Li, 2005
- Gammarus malpaisensis Walters, Cannizzaro & Berg, 2021
- Gammarus marmouchensis Fadil, 2006
- Gammarus maroccanus Fadil & Dakki, 2001
- Gammarus martensi Hou & Li, 2004
- Gammarus matienus Derzhavin, 1938
- Gammarus miae Mateus & Mateus, 1990
- Gammarus microps Pinkster & Goedmakers, 1975
- Gammarus minus Say, 1818
- Gammarus mladeni Karaman & Pinkster, 1977
- Gammarus monospeliensis Pinkster, 1972
- Gammarus montanus Hou, Li & Platvoet, 2004
- Gammarus morcea Özbek & Aydin, 2023
- Gammarus mucronatus Say, 1818
- Gammarus murarius Hou & Li, 2004
- Gammarus nekkensis Uchida, 1935
- Gammarus ninglangensis Hou & Li, 2003
- Gammarus nipponensis Uéno, 1940
- Gammarus nox Stock, 1995
- Gammarus nudus Martynov, 1931
- Gammarus obnixus Karaman & Pinkster, 1977
- Gammarus obruki Özbek, 2012
- Gammarus oceanicus Segerstråle, 1947
- Gammarus ocellatus Martynov, 1930
- Gammarus ochridensis (Schäferna, 1926)
- Gammarus odaensis Lee & Kim, 1980
- Gammarus odettae Mateus & Mateus, 1990
- Gammarus oeningensis Heer, 1865†
- Gammarus orinos Pinkster & Schol, 1984
- Gammarus oronticus Alouf, 1979
- Gammarus osellai Karaman & Pinkster, 1977
- Gammarus pageti Mateus & Mateus, 1990
- Gammarus palustris Bousfield, 1969
- Gammarus parechiniformis G. Karaman, 1977
- Gammarus paricrenatus Stock, Mirzajani, Vonk, Naderi & Kiabi, 1998
- Gammarus parthicus Stock, Mirzajani, Vonk, Naderi & Kiabi, 1998
- Gammarus paucispinus Hou & Li, 2002
- Gammarus pavlovici
- Gammarus pavo Karaman & Pinkster, 1977
- Gammarus paynei Delong, 1992
- Gammarus pecos Cole & Bousfield, 1970
- Gammarus pellucidus Gurjanova, 1930
- Gammarus percalacustris Walters, Cannizzaro & Berg, 2021
- Gammarus pexus Hou & Li, 2005
- Gammarus platvoeti Hou & Li, 2003
- Gammarus pljakici G. Karaman, 1964
- Gammarus plumipes Mateus & Mateus, 1990
- Gammarus praecyrius Derzhavin, 1941†
- Gammarus preciosus Wang, Hou & Li, 2009
- Gammarus pretzmanni Mateus & Mateus, 1990
- Gammarus proiectus Stock, Mirzajani, Vonk, Naderi & Kiabi, 1998
- Gammarus pseudoanatoliensis Karaman & Pinkster, 1987
- Gammarus pseudolimnaeus Bousfield, 1958
- Gammarus pseudosyriacus Karaman & Pinkster, 1977
- Gammarus pulex Linnaeus, 1758
- Gammarus qiani Hou & Li, 2002
- Gammarus rambouseki S. Karaman, 1931
- Gammarus retzi Maikovsky, 1941†
- Gammarus rifatlensis Fadil, 2006
- Gammarus riparius Hou & Li, 2002
- Gammarus roeselii Gervais, 1835
- Gammarus rouxi Pinkster & Goedmakers, 1975
- Gammarus salemaai G. Karaman, 1985
- Gammarus salinus Spooner, 1947
- Gammarus sepidannus Zamanpoore, Poeckl, Grabowski & Schiemer, 2009
- Gammarus setosus Dementieva, 1931
- Gammarus shanxiensis Barnard & Dai, 1988
- Gammarus shenmuensis Hou & Li, 2004
- Gammarus sichuanensis Hou, Li & Zheng, 2002
- Gammarus sinuolatus Hou & Li, 2004
- Gammarus sirvannus Hekmatara, Sari & Baladehi, 2011
- Gammarus sketi G. Karaman, 1989
- Gammarus sobaegensis G. Karaman, 1984
- Gammarus solidus G. Karaman, 1977
- Gammarus songirdaki G. Karaman, 1984
- Gammarus soyoensis Lee & Kim, 1980
- Gammarus spelaeus Martynov, 1931
- Gammarus spinipalmus (Chen, 1939)
- Gammarus spooneri G. Karaman, 1991
- Gammarus stagnarius Hou, Li & Morino, 2002
- Gammarus stalagmiticus Hou & Li, 2005
- Gammarus stankokaramani G. Karaman, 1976
- Gammarus stojicevici (S. Karaman, 1929)
- Gammarus stupendus Pinkster, 1983
- Gammarus subtypicus Stock, 1966
- Gammarus suifunensis Martynov, 1925
- Gammarus syriacus Chevreux, 1895
- Gammarus takesensis Hou, Li & Platvoet, 2004
- Gammarus taliensis Shen, 1954
- Gammarus tauricus Martynov, 1931
- Gammarus teletzkensis Martynov, 1930
- Gammarus tigrinus Sexton, 1939
- Gammarus topkarai Özbek & Balik, 2009
- Gammarus translucidus Hou, Li & Li, 2004
- Gammarus troglophilus Hubricht & Mackins, 1940
- Gammarus truncatus Martynov, 1930
- Gammarus turanus Martynov, 1935
- Gammarus uludagi G. S. Karaman, 1975
- Gammarus unguiserratus Costa, 1853
- Gammarus ustaoglui Özbek & Guloglu, 2005
- Gammarus varsoviensis Jazdzewski, 1975
- Gammarus vignai Pinkster & Karaman, 1978
- Gammarus wangbangensis Lee & Seo, 1990
- Gammarus wautieri Roux, 1967
- Gammarus wilkitzkii Birula, 1897
- Gammarus xiangfengensis Hou & Li, 2002
- Gammarus zaddachi Sexton, 1912
- Gammarus zagrosensis Zamanpoore, Poeckl, Grabowski & Schiemer, 2009
- Gammarus zeongogensis Lee & Kim, 1980
