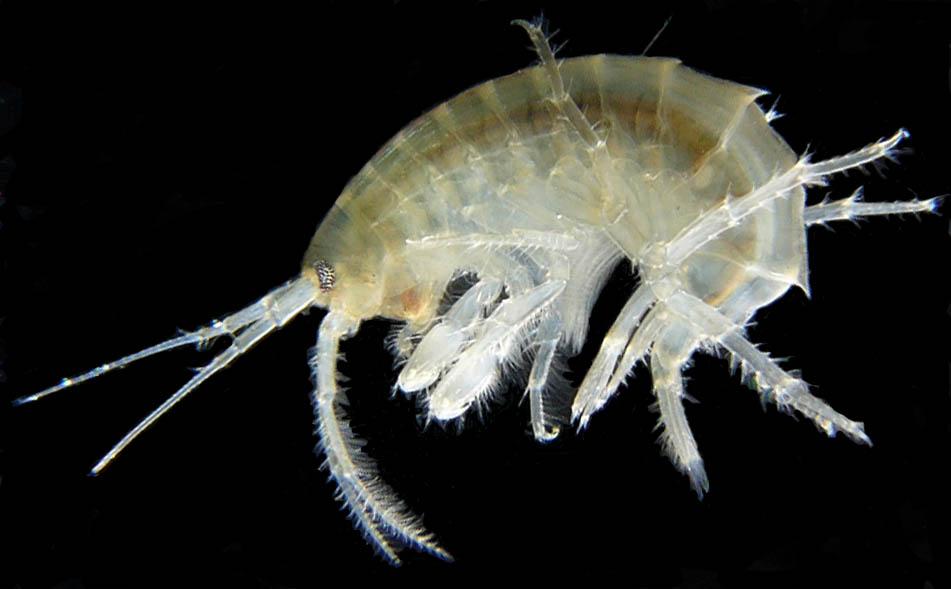

Scientific classification
- Kingdom: Animalia
- Phylum: Arthropoda
- Clade: Pancrustacea
- Class: Malacostraca
- Order: Amphipoda
- Family: Gammaridae
- Genus: Gammarus
- Species: G. roeselii

Binomial name
- Gammarus roeselii Gervais, 1835

Synonyms
- Gammarus roeseli (lapsus); Rivulogammarus roeseli

= Gammarus roeseli =

Species of crustacean

Gammarus roeselii is a species of freshwater amphipod native to Europe.

== Nomenclature ==
Gervais described G. roeselii in 1835 under today's correct name G. roeselii GERVAIS, 1835. Since he wrote the description in Latin and used the Latinized name of the baron, i.e. "ROESELIUS", the genitive form is roeselii. Therefore the spelling with double i is taxonomically correct, but often the spelling with only one i is often used.

== Description ==
Gammarus roeselii adult males reach a length of up to 22 mm; females are smaller than males. The species is distinct from many other common amphipods due to the spines on its fifth through seventh pereiopods. The color of G. roeselii individuals can vary from green to brown, gray, or yellow, and some have reddish markings on parts of their carapaces.

== Distribution ==
Gammarus roeselii originated in the Balkan area of Europe, and appears to have populated the Pannonian Basin as a glacial refuge before expanding into central and western Europe 10,000 years ago. It is now widespread across continental Europe. Having been in France since at least the mid-1800s it is considered to be a well-established non-native species in central, northern, and western Europe. However, it continues to expand its distribution range, including into new river basins in Italy in the 2010s. Even within the same geographic area – for example in France – some refer to the species as being invasive while others refer to it as being naturalized.

== Cryptic species complex ==
Molecular phylogeographic studies based primarily on mitochondrial markers suggest that G. roeselii is not a single species but a cryptic species complex with deeply divergent evolutionary lineages. Recent analyses identified 13 well-supported molecular operational taxonomic units (MOTUs), indicating numerous locally endemic lineages across the Balkan Peninsula. These lineages diverged mainly during the Miocene and Pliocene (ca. 20–2.6 Ma), indicating an ancient origin rather than recent ecological separation. Their cryptic nature may result not only from true morphological similarity but also from high within-lineage variation that obscures differences between species. Most lineages show restricted geographic ranges, highlighting the Balkan Peninsula as a hotspot of freshwater endemism.

== Ecology ==
=== Habitat ===
Gammarus roeselii are found in freshwater environments such as ponds, lakes and streams. They are more abundant at warmer temperatures compared to some co-occurring amphipod species. Populations tend to be highest in rivers with moderate water flow and ample plants to be used as shelter.

=== Trophic interactions ===
Gammarus roeselii are omnivores. Although they feed on animal prey, their mouthparts are morphologically better suited for ingesting detritus and suspended particles, as well as for scraping algae and fungi off detritus and other surfaces. Studies across the cryptic species complex indicate that distinct genetic lineages occupy comparable trophic positions, suggesting functional equivalence among allopatric lineages despite deep genetic divergence.

Gammarus roeselii are predated on by fish. The distinctive spines of G. roeselii were found in a laboratory experiment to be associated with defense against predation by brown trout.

Like other gammaridean amphipods, G. roeselii serve as hosts for microsporidian parasites. The parasites have a variety of effects on infected G. roeselii. Physiologically, infection can increase salinity tolerance. Infection by some microsporidians can feminize male embryos and lead to female-biased sex ratios. Infection status also alters predator-avoidance behavior in G. roeselii.

=== Life history ===
Males and females form precopulatory mating pairs; after mating, females carry eggs in a brood pouch and then release juveniles. Clutch size is variable, reaching up to 80 or more eggs for some females; clutch sizes are smaller, but eggs are larger, in the winter than during warmer months. Development in the brood pouch can take anywhere from 10 to over 200 days depending on water temperature, and survival of embryos is highest between 10 and 16 °C. Females can produce up to eight broods over their lifetimes. Juveniles moult nine or ten times before reaching sexual maturity. A study investigating potential life-history differences among the cryptic lineages of the species complex found no significant variation; traits such as clutch size are similar across lineages.

=== Traits associated with range expansion ===
Gammarus roeselii are a successful invasive species due to their high reproductive rate, tolerance to changing environmental conditions and unique anti-predation characteristics. G. roeselii's mechanism of invasion is still unknown but it is most likely due to human activities such as aquaculture or fish repopulation. G. roeselii were once used as a food source in commercial fisheries, so it is possible that some individuals escaped and were able to populate new areas. G. roeselii have the ability to easily attach their bodies to substrates by using the spines on its metasomes. These organisms are also able to survive out of water for several days at a time, making the transfer of G. roeselii feasible over land.

=== Sensitivity to environmental impacts ===
Gammarus roeselii is rather tolerant compared to other gammarids and also tolerates a certain degree of anthropogenic disturbance. Gammarus roeselii populations from pesticide-contaminated river systems in Central Europe have been shown to develop increased tolerance to neonicotinoid insecticides over time. This suggests that this species may persist in polluted habitats due to their ability to rapidly adapt to chemical stressors. A number of further studies have investigated the effects of toxins and pollutants on G. roeselii. In the 1980s, the insecticides Dyfonate and Ditrifon (which has since been banned in the European Union, India, and other countries) were found to be toxic to G. roeselii. More recently, investigations about imidacloprid, another insecticide, indicated sublethal effects on G. roeseli at environmentally-relevant levels, including effects on reproductive females. Silver nanoparticles have been found to reduce the feeding rate of G. roeseli. A study investigating whether different lineages within the G. roeselii cryptic species complex vary in their sensitivity to environmental stressors found that tolerance to the neonicotinoid insecticide thiacloprid was primarily shaped by population-specific adaptation to local pollution, rather than by deep phylogenetic differences among genetic lineages.

=== Parasite interactions ===
Interactions with parasites can influence the sensitivity of G. roeselii to environmental stressors. Experimental work has shown that infection with acanthocephalan parasites can increase the amphipod's short-term tolerance to insecticides, with infected individuals displaying higher EC_{50} values after exposure to deltamethrin compared to uninfected counterparts. Parasites may also alter host pollutant dynamics: acanthocephalans have been shown to accumulate organic micropollutants at concentrations up to 35-fold higher than their G. roeselii hosts, effectively reducing host pollutant burdens. These findings suggest that parasitism can modulate both chemical stress responses and pollutant bioaccumulation in G. roeselii. The sensitivity of G. roeseli to different stressors may also be affected by infection of microsporidian parasites. For example, infected females were found to be more strongly affected by exposure to cadmium.
