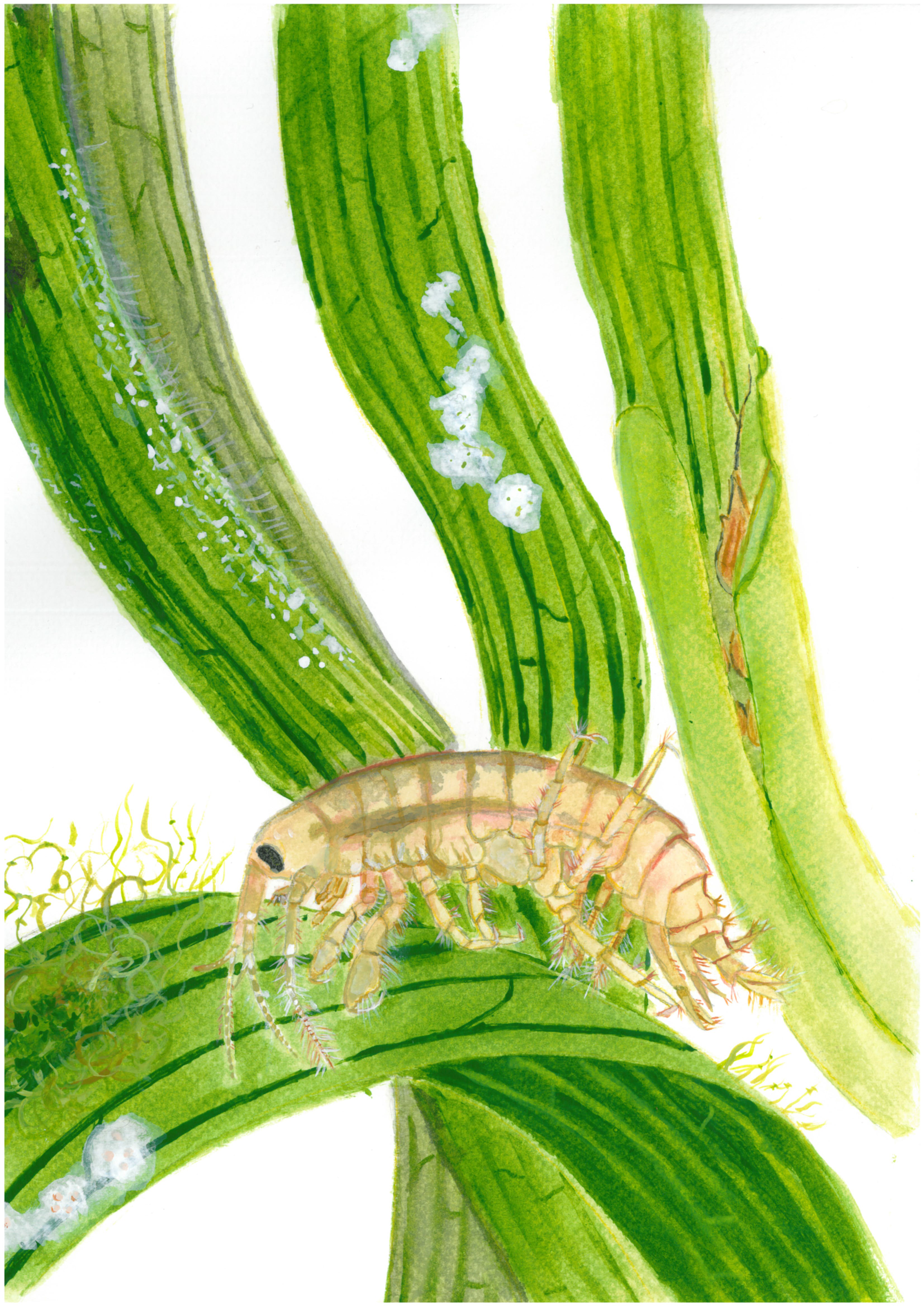

Scientific classification
- Kingdom: Animalia
- Phylum: Arthropoda
- Clade: Pancrustacea
- Class: Malacostraca
- Order: Amphipoda
- Family: Gammaridae
- Genus: Gammarus
- Species: G. locusta

Binomial name
- Gammarus locusta (Linnaeus, 1758)

= Gammarus locusta =

Species of crustacean

Gammarus locusta is a species of amphipod the family Gammaridae.

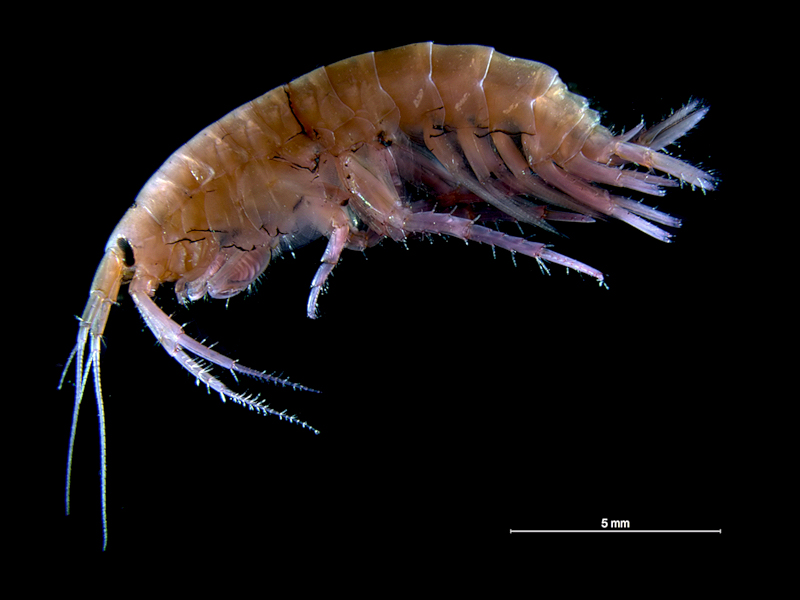
