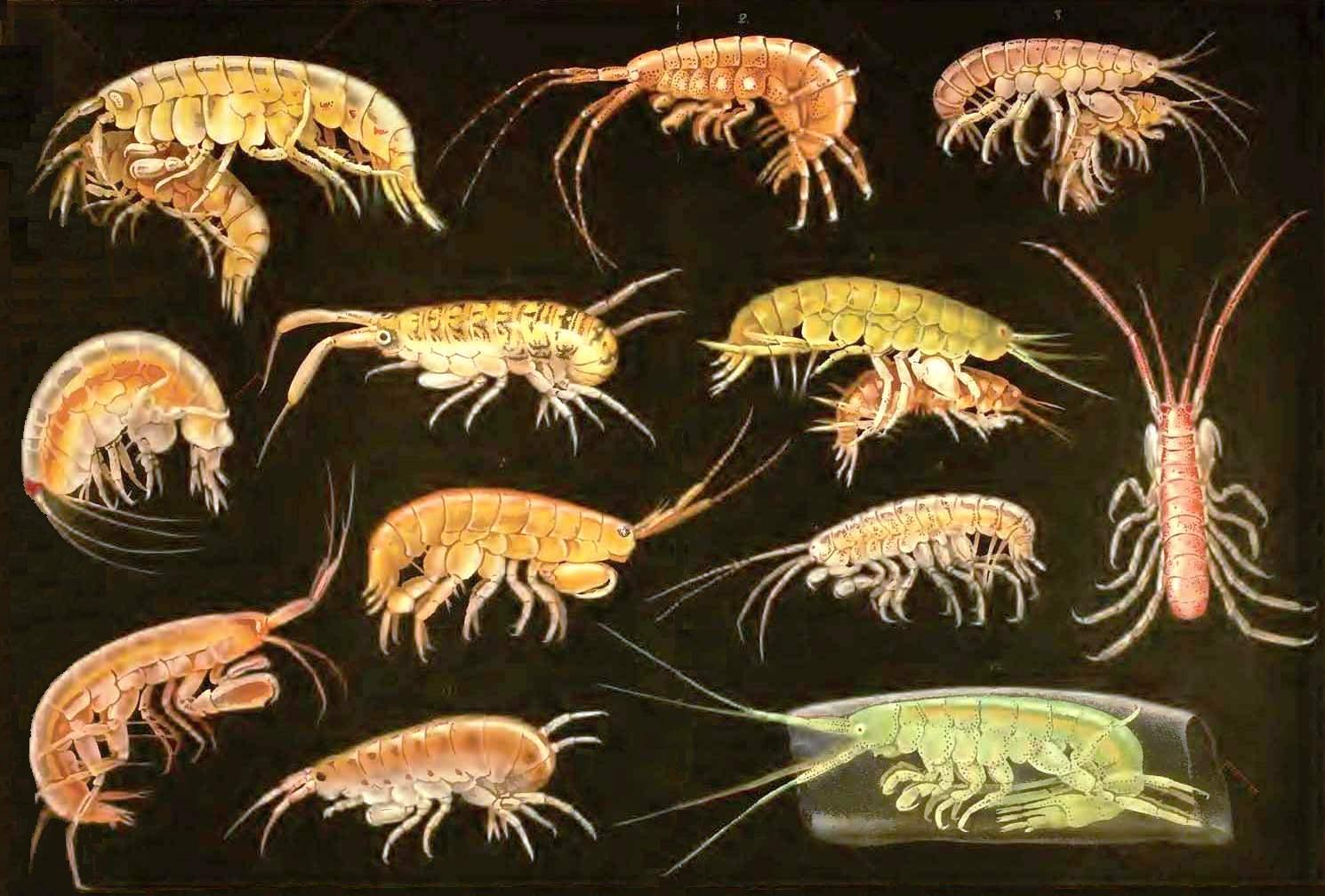
- Gammarids from the Gulf of Naples (Note: From left to right, top to bottom: Gammarus locusta (Linnaeus, 1758) (♂ & ♀); Amphithoe rubricata (Montagu, 1808) (♂); Hyale pontica Rathke, 1836 (♂ & ♀); Ampelisca rubella A. Costa, 1864 (♂); Deshayesorchestia deshayesii (Audouin, 1826) (♂); Apohyale prevostii (H. Milne Edwards, 1830) (♂ & ♀); Podocerus brasiliensis (Dana, 1853) (♂); Transorchestia chiliensis (H. Milne Edwards, 1840) (♂); Aora gracilis (Spence Bate, 1857) (♂); Maera grossimana (Montagu, 1808) (♂); Orchestia gammarellus (Pallas, 1766) (♂); Cymadusa crassicornis (Costa, 1853) (♀))

Scientific classification
- Kingdom: Animalia
- Phylum: Arthropoda
- Clade: Pancrustacea
- Class: Malacostraca
- Order: Amphipoda
- Suborder: Gammaridea; Latreille, 1802

Groups included
- See text

= Gammaridea =

Former suborder of crustaceans

Gammaridea was one of the suborders of the order Amphipoda, comprising small, shrimp-like crustaceans. In a traditional classification, it encompassed about 7,275 (92%) of the 7,900 species of amphipods described by then, in approximately 1,000 genera, divided among around 125 families. That concept of Gammaridea included almost all freshwater amphipods, while most of the members still were marine.

The group is however considered paraphyletic, and was deconstructed in a series of papers by the amphipod taxonomists James K. Lowry and Alan A. Myers. In 2003 they moved several families from Gammaridea to join members of the former Caprellidea in a new suborder Corophiidea. Further, in 2013 another large suborder Senticaudata was established, which would encompass much of the original Gammaridea, particularly its freshwater families, and into which also the Corophiidea was merged. The remaining 85 Gammaridea families, of superfamilies Liljeborgioidea, Lysianassoidea and Eusiroidea were rearranged to the new suborder Amphilochoidea in the final subordinal revision (2017), which no longer recognizes Gammaridea as a taxon.
