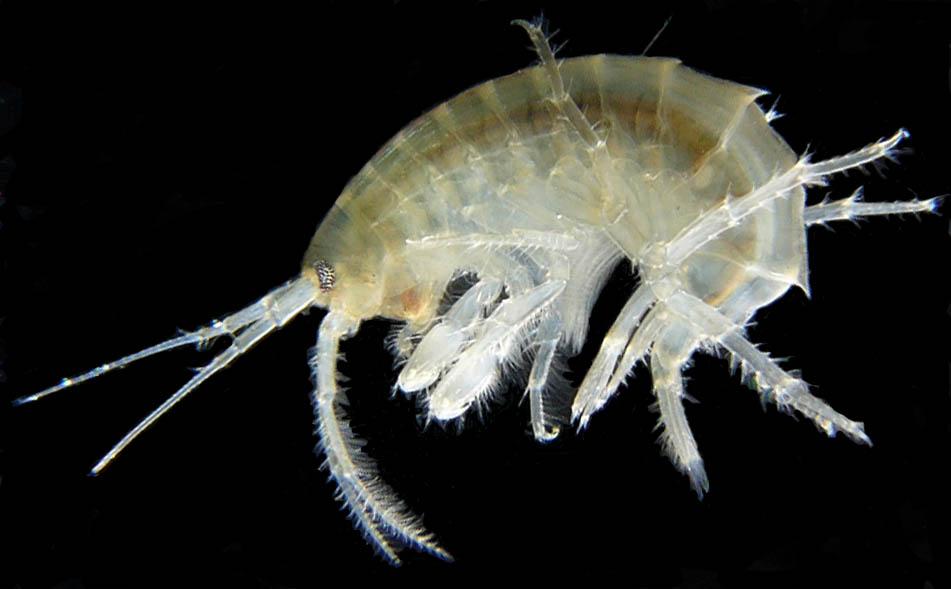
- Gammarus roeselii

Scientific classification
- Kingdom: Animalia
- Phylum: Arthropoda
- Clade: Pancrustacea
- Class: Malacostraca
- Order: Amphipoda
- Suborder: Senticaudata
- Infraorder: Gammarida
- Parvorder: Gammaridira
- Superfamily: Gammaroidea
- Family: Gammaridae; Leach, 1813

Genera
- Numerous, see text

= Gammaridae =

Family of crustaceans

Gammaridae is a family of amphipods. In North America they are included among the folk taxonomic category of "scuds", and otherwise gammarids is usually used as a common name.

They have a wide distribution, centered on Eurasia, and are euryhaline as a lineage, inhabiting fresh to marine waters.

== Systematics ==
The Gammaridae were for a long time used as a "wastebin taxon", which included numerous genera of gammaridean amphipods that since then have been removed to their own families, such as the Anisogammaridae, Melitidae and Niphargidae.

The following genera are currently listed in the family:

- Akerogammarus Derzhavin & Pjatakova, 1967
- Albanogammarus Ruffo, 1995
- Amathillina G. O. Sars, 1894
- Axelboeckia Stebbing, 1899
- Baku Karaman & Barnard, 1979
- Cephalogammarus Karaman & Barnard, 1979
- Chaetogammarus Martynov, 1924
- Comatogammarus Stock, 1981
- Condiciogammarus G. Karaman, 1984
- Dershavinella Birstein, 1938
- Dikerogammarus Stebbing, 1899
- Echinogammarus Stebbing, 1899
- Gammarus Fabricius, 1775
- Gmelina G. O. Sars, 1894
- Gmelinopsis G. O. Sars, 1896
- Homoeogammarus Schellenberg, 1937
- Ilvanella Vigna-Taglianti, 1971
- Jubeogammarus G. Karaman, 1984
- Jugogammarus S. Karaman, 1953
- Kuzmelina Karaman & Barnard, 1979
- Lanceogammarus Karaman & Barnard, 1979
- Laurogammarus G. Karaman, 1984
- Longigammarus G.S. Karaman, 1970
- Lunulogammarus Krapp-Schickel, Ruffo & Schiecke, 1994
- Lusigammarus Barnard & Barnard, 1983
- Marinogammarus Sexton & Spooner, 1940
- Neogammarus Ruffo, 1937
- Parhomoeogammarus Schellenberg, 1943
- Pectenogammarus Reid, 1940
- Relictogammarus Hou & Sket, 2016
- Rhipidogammarus Stock, 1971
- Sarothrogammarus Martynov, 1935
- Scytaelina Stock, Mirzajani, Vonk, Naderi & Kiabi, 1998
- Shablogammarus Carausu, Dobreanu & Manolache, 1955
- Sinogammarus Karaman & Ruffo, 1994
- Sowinskya Derzhavin, 1948
- Tadzhikistania Barnard & Barnard, 1983
- Tadzocrangonyx Karaman & Barnard, 1979
- Trichogammarus Hou & Sket, 2016
- Tyrrhenogammarus Karaman & Ruffo, 1989
- Yogmelina Karaman & Barnard, 1979
