= United States Fish and Wildlife Service list of threatened and endangered arthropods =

List of threatened and endangered arthropods, including insects, arachnids, and crustaceans under the United States Endangered Species Act as of October 2013.

Key to Listing Status codes:
E - Endangered. An animal or plant species in danger of extinction throughout all or a significant portion of its range.
T - Threatened. An animal or plant species likely to become endangered within the foreseeable future throughout all or a significant portion of its range.
SAE or SAT - Listed as Endangered or Threatened due to similarity of appearance. A species may be treated as endangered or threatened if it resembles in appearance a species which has been listed and enforcement personnel would have difficulty distinguishing between the listed and the unlisted species; if the effect of this difficulty is an additional threat to the listed species; and if such treatment of the unlisted species would improve protection for the listed species.

Inverted common name	Scientific name	Species group	Historic range	Where listed	Listing status
Spider, Kauai cave wolf or pe'e pe'e maka 'ole	Adelocosa anops	Arachnids	U.S.A. (HI)	Entire	E
Meshweaver, Robber Baron Cave	Cicurina baronia	Arachnids	U.S.A. (TX).	Entire	E
Meshweaver, Madla's Cave; Meshweaver, Braken Bat Cave	Cicurina madla, syn. Cicurina venii	Arachnids	U.S.A. (TX).	Entire	E
Meshweaver, Government Canyon Bat Cave	Cicurina vespera	Arachnids	U.S.A. (TX).	Entire	E
Spider, Tooth Cave	Leptoneta myopica	Arachnids	U.S.A. (TX)	Entire	E
Spider, spruce-fir moss	Microhexura montivaga	Arachnids	U.S.A. (NC, TN)	Entire	E
Spider, Government Canyon Bat Cave	Tayshaneta microps	Arachnids	U.S.A. (TX).	Entire	E
Pseudoscorpion, Tooth Cave	Tartarocreagris texana	Arachnids	U.S.A. (TX)	Entire	E
Harvestman, Cokendolpher Cave	Texella cokendolpheri	Arachnids	U.S.A. (TX).	Entire	E
Harvestman, Bee Creek Cave	Texella reddelli	Arachnids	U.S.A. (TX)	Entire	E
Harvestman, Bone Cave	Texella reyesi	Arachnids	U.S.A. (TX)	Entire	E
Isopod, Madison Cave	Antrolana lira	Crustaceans	U.S.A. (VA)	Entire	T
Fairy shrimp, Conservancy	Branchinecta conservatio	Crustaceans	U.S.A. (CA)	Entire	E
Fairy shrimp, longhorn	Branchinecta longiantenna	Crustaceans	U.S.A. (CA)	Entire	E
Fairy shrimp, vernal pool	Branchinecta lynchi	Crustaceans	U.S.A. (CA, OR)	Entire	T
Fairy shrimp, San Diego	Branchinecta sandiegonensis	Crustaceans	U.S.A. (CA)	Entire	E
Crayfish, Benton County cave	Cambarus aculabrum	Crustaceans	U.S.A. (AR)	Entire	E
Crayfish, Hell Creek Cave	Cambarus zophonastes	Crustaceans	U.S.A. (AR)	Entire	E
Amphipod, Illinois cave	Gammarus acherondytes	Crustaceans	U.S.A. (IL)	Entire	E
Amphipod, Noel's	Gammarus desperatus	Crustaceans	U.S.A. (NM)	Entire	E
Amphipod, diminutive	Gammarus hyalelloides	Crustaceans	U.S.A. (TX).	Entire	E
Tadpole shrimp, vernal pool	Lepidurus packardi	Crustaceans	U.S.A. (CA)	Entire	E
Isopod, Lee County cave	Lirceus usdagalun	Crustaceans	U.S.A. (VA)	Entire	E
Crayfish, Nashville	Faxonius shoupi	Crustaceans	U.S.A. (TN)	Entire	E
Crayfish, Shasta	Pacifastacus fortis	Crustaceans	U.S.A. (CA)	Entire	E
Shrimp, Squirrel Chimney Cave	Palaemonetes cummingi	Crustaceans	U.S.A. (FL)	Entire	T
Shrimp, Alabama cave	Palaemonias alabamae	Crustaceans	U.S.A. (AL)	Entire	E
Shrimp, Kentucky cave	Palaemonias ganteri	Crustaceans	U.S.A. (KY)	Entire	E
Amphipod, Kauai cave	Spelaeorchestia koloana	Crustaceans	U.S.A. (HI)	Entire	E
Fairy shrimp, Riverside	Streptocephalus woottoni	Crustaceans	U.S.A. (CA)	Entire	E
Amphipod, Peck's cave	Stygobromus pecki	Crustaceans	U.S.A. (TX)	Entire	E
Amphipod, Hay's Spring	Stygobromus hayi	Crustaceans	U.S.A. (DC)	Entire	E
Shrimp, California freshwater	Syncaris pacifica	Crustaceans	U.S.A. (CA)	Entire	E
Isopod, Socorro	Thermosphaeroma thermophilum	Crustaceans	U.S.A. (NM)	Entire	E
Naucorid, Ash Meadows	Ambrysus amargosus	Insects	U.S.A. (NV)	Entire	T
Butterfly, Lange's metalmark	Apodemia mormo langei	Insects	U.S.A. (CA)	Entire	E
Beetle, Coffin Cave mold	Batrisodes texanus	Insects	U.S.A. (TX)	Entire	E
Beetle, Helotes mold	Batrisodes venyivi	Insects	U.S.A. (TX)	Entire	E
Butterfly, Uncompahgre fritillary	Boloria acrocnema	Insects	U.S.A. (CO)	Entire	E
Beetle, Hungerford's crawling water	Brychius hungerfordi	Insects	U.S.A. (MI, Canada)	Entire	E
Butterfly, San Bruno elfin	Callophrys mossii bayensis	Insects	U.S.A. (CA)	Entire	E
Tiger beetle, Northeastern beach	Cicindela dorsalis dorsalis	Insects	U.S.A. (CT, MA, MD, NJ, NY, PA, RI, VA)	Entire	T
Tiger beetle, Salt Creek	Cicindela nevadica lincolniana	Insects	U.S.A. (NE)	Entire	E
Tiger beetle, Ohlone	Cicindela ohlone	Insects	U.S.A. (CA)	Entire	E
Tiger beetle, Puritan	Cicindela puritana	Insects	U.S.A. (CT, MA, MD, NH, VT)	Entire	T
Butterfly, Miami Blue	Cyclargus (=Hemiargus) thomasi bethunebakeri	Insects	U.S.A. (FL)	Entire	E
Butterfly, nickerbean blue	Cyclargus ammon	Insects		Entire	SAT
Beetle, valley elderberry longhorn	Desmocerus californicus dimorphus	Insects	U.S.A. (CA)	Entire	T
June Beetle, Caseys	Dinacoma caseyi	Insects	U.S.A. (CA)	Entire	E
Pomace fly, [unnamed]	Drosophila aglaia	Insects	U.S.A. (HI)	Entire	E
Pomace fly, [unnamed]	Drosophila differens	Insects	U.S.A. (HI)	Entire	E
Pomace fly, [unnamed]	Drosophila hemipeza	Insects	U.S.A. (HI)	Entire	E
Pomace fly, [unnamed]	Drosophila heteroneura	Insects	U.S.A. (HI)	Entire	E
Pomace fly, [unnamed]	Drosophila montgomeryi	Insects	U.S.A. (HI)	Entire	E
Pomace fly, [unnamed]	Drosophila mulli	Insects	U.S.A. (HI)	Entire	T
Pomace fly, [unnamed]	Drosophila musaphilia	Insects	U.S.A. (HI)	Entire	E
Pomace fly, [unnamed]	Drosophila neoclavisetae	Insects	U.S.A. (HI)	Entire	E
Pomace fly, [unnamed]	Drosophila obatai	Insects	U.S.A. (HI)	Entire	E
Pomace fly, [unnamed]	Drosophila ochrobasis	Insects	U.S.A. (HI)	Entire	E
Fly, Hawaiian picture-wing	Drosophila sharpi	Insects	U.S.A. (HI)	Entire	E
Pomace fly, [unnamed]	Drosophila substenoptera	Insects	U.S.A. (HI)	Entire	E
Pomace fly, [unnamed]	Drosophila tarphytrichia	Insects	U.S.A. (HI)	Entire	E
Beetle, delta green ground	Elaphrus viridis	Insects	U.S.A. (CA)	Entire	T
Butterfly, El Segundo blue	Euphilotes battoides allyni	Insects	U.S.A. (CA)	Entire	E
Butterfly, Smith's blue	Euphilotes enoptes smithi	Insects	U.S.A. (CA)	Entire	E
Butterfly, Bay checkerspot	Euphydryas editha bayensis	Insects	U.S.A. (CA)	Entire	T
Butterfly, Quino checkerspot	Euphydryas editha quino (=E. e. wrighti)	Insects		Entire	E
Moth, Kern primrose sphinx	Euproserpinus euterpe	Insects	U.S.A. (CA)	Entire	T
Butterfly, Palos Verdes blue	Glaucopsyche lygdamus palosverdesensis	Insects	U.S.A. (CA)	Entire	E
Butterfly, ceraunus blue	Hemiargus ceraunus antibubastus	Insects		Entire	SAT
Butterfly, Schaus swallowtail	Heraclides aristodemus ponceanus	Insects	U.S.A. (FL)	Entire	E
Skipper, Pawnee montane	Hesperia leonardus montana	Insects	U.S.A. (CO)	Entire	T
Beetle, Comal Springs riffle	Heterelmis comalensis	Insects	U.S.A. (TX)	Entire	E
Butterfly, Fender's blue	Icaricia icarioides fenderi	Insects	U.S.A. (OR)	Entire	E
Butterfly, mission blue	Icaricia icarioides missionensis	Insects	U.S.A. (CA)	Entire	E
Butterfly, Mount Charleston blue	Icaricia shasta charlestonensis	Insects	U.S.A. (NV)	Entire	E
Butterfly, cassius blue	Leptotes cassius theonus	Insects		Entire	SAT
Moth, Blackburn's sphinx	Manduca blackburni	Insects	U.S.A. (HI)	Entire	E
Damselfly, crimson Hawaiian	Megalagrion leptodemas	Insects	U.S.A. (HI)	Entire	E
Damselfly, flying earwig Hawaiian	Megalagrion nesiotes	Insects	U.S.A. (HI)	Entire	E
Damselfly, blackline Hawaiian	Megalagrion nigrohamatum nigrolineatum	Insects	U.S.A. (HI)	Entire	E
Damselfly, oceanic Hawaiian	Megalagrion oceanicum	Insects	U.S.A. (HI)	Entire	E
Damselfly, Pacific Hawaiian	Megalagrion pacificum	Insects	U.S.A. (HI)	Entire	E
Butterfly, Saint Francis' satyr	Neonympha mitchellii francisci	Insects	U.S.A. (NC)	Entire	E
Butterfly, Mitchell's satyr	Neonympha mitchellii mitchellii	Insects	U.S.A. (IN, MI, NJ, OH)	Entire	E
Beetle, American burying	Nicrophorus americanus	Insects	U.S.A. (eastern States south to FL, west to SD and TX), eastern Canada	Entire, except where listed as an experimental population	E
Butterfly, Luzon peacock swallowtail	Papilio chikae	Insects	Philippines	Entire	E
Butterfly, Homerus swallowtail	Papilio homerus	Insects	Jamaica	Entire	E
Butterfly, Corsican swallowtail	Papilio hospiton	Insects	Corsica, Sardinia	Entire	E
Butterfly, lotis blue	Plebejus idas lotis	Insects	U.S.A. (CA)	Entire	E
Butterfly, Karner blue	Plebejus melissa samuelis	Insects	U.S.A. (IL, IN, MA, MI, MN, NH, NY, OH, PA, WI), Canada (Ont.)	Entire	E
Beetle, Mount Hermon June	Polyphylla barbata	Insects	U.S.A. (CA)	Entire	E
Skipper, Carson wandering	Pseudocopaeodes eunus obscurus	Insects	U.S.A. (CA, NV)	U.S.A., (Lassen County, CA; Washoe County, NV)	E
Skipper, Laguna Mountains	Pyrgus ruralis lagunae	Insects	U.S.A. (CA)	Entire	E
Ground beetle, [unnamed]	Rhadine exilis	Insects	U.S.A. (TX)	Entire	E
Ground beetle, [unnamed]	Rhadine infernalis	Insects	U.S.A. (TX)	Entire	E
Beetle, Tooth Cave ground	Rhadine persephone	Insects	U.S.A. (TX)	Entire	E
Fly, Delhi Sands flower-loving	Rhaphiomidas terminatus abdominalis	Insects	U.S.A. (CA)	Entire	E
Dragonfly, Hine's emerald	Somatochlora hineana	Insects	U.S.A. (IL, IN, OH, WI)	Entire	E
Butterfly, callippe silverspot	Speyeria callippe callippe	Insects	U.S.A. (CA)	Entire	E
Butterfly, Behren's silverspot	Speyeria zerene behrensii	Insects	U.S.A. (CA)	Entire	E
Butterfly, Oregon silverspot	Speyeria zerene hippolyta	Insects	U.S.A. (CA, OR, WA)	Entire	T
Butterfly, Myrtle's silverspot	Speyeria zerene myrtleae	Insects	U.S.A. (CA)	Entire	E
Beetle, Comal Springs dryopid	Stygoparnus comalensis	Insects	U.S.A. (TX)	Entire	E
Beetle, Kretschmarr Cave mold	Texamaurops reddelli	Insects	U.S.A. (TX)	Entire	E
Grasshopper, Zayante band-winged	Trimerotropis infantilis	Insects	U.S.A. (CA)	Entire	E
Butterfly, Queen Alexandra's birdwing	Troides alexandrae	Insects	Papua New Guinea	Entire	E

== See also ==
- Endangered arthropods
- United States Fish and Wildlife Service list of endangered species of mammals and birds
- Conservation biology
