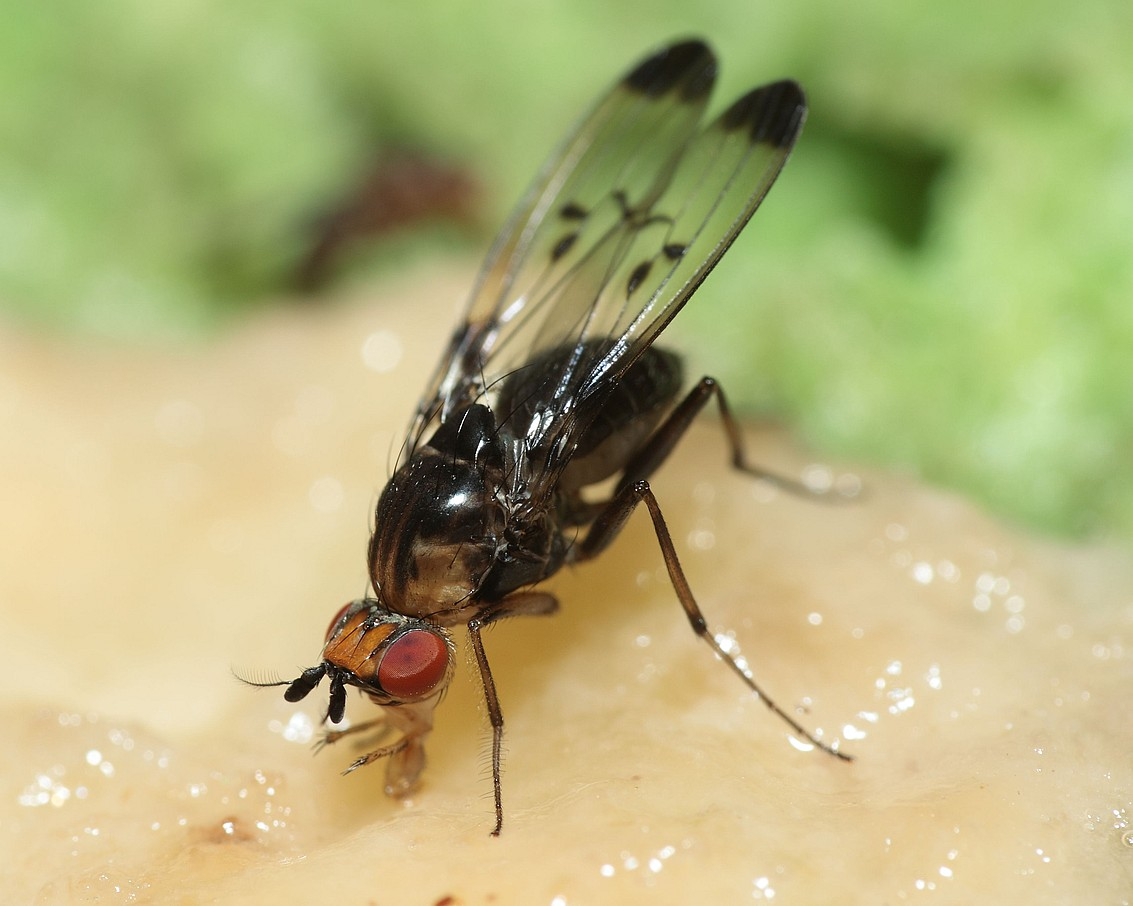
- Drosophila silvestris

Scientific classification
- Kingdom: Animalia
- Phylum: Arthropoda
- Class: Insecta
- Order: Diptera
- Family: Drosophilidae
- Genus: Drosophila
- Subgenus: Drosophila

Species groups
- See text

= Hawaiian Drosophila =

Group of flies

The Hawaiian Drosophilidae are a lineage of flies within the genus Drosophila. This monophyletic clade includes all of the endemic Hawaiian Drosophila and all members of the genus Scaptomyza, which contains both Hawaiian and non-Hawaiian species. The Hawaiian Drosophilidae are descended from a common ancestor estimated to have lived 25 million years ago. Species of Hawaiian Drosophilidae flies have been studied as models of speciation and behavioral evolution. Along with other members of the native Hawaiian ecosystem, the conservations status of many species of Hawaiian Drosophilidae is threatened by habitat loss and introduced predators, among other factors.

== Diversity ==
There are an estimated 1,000 species of Hawaiian Drosophilidae. As of 2022, 689 species have been described, including 273 species in the genus Scaptomyza, of which 148 are endemic to the Hawaiian archipelago, and 416 Hawaiian endemic species in the genus Drosophila. Within the Hawaiian Drosophila there are several major groups, including the modified-mouthpart, modified-tarsus, and antopocerus species groups, and the picture-wing clade.

=== Scaptomyza ===
The genus Scaptomyza, which contains both Hawaiian and non-Hawaiian species, is the sister lineage to the Hawaiian Drosophila, and Hawaiian species in this genus are often included when speaking about the Hawaiian Drosophila generally. The Hawaiian and non-Hawaiian distribution of Scaptomyza can be explained as either the result of multiple colonizations of Hawaii, or as the result of one colonization by the common ancestor of Scaptomyza and Hawaiian Drosophila, followed by several migrations back to continents. Scaptomyza is one of several genera that are currently nested within the genus Drosophila, rendering it paraphyletic.

=== Hawaiian Drosophila ===
==== Picture-wing, nudidrosophila, ateledrosophila (PNA) clade ====
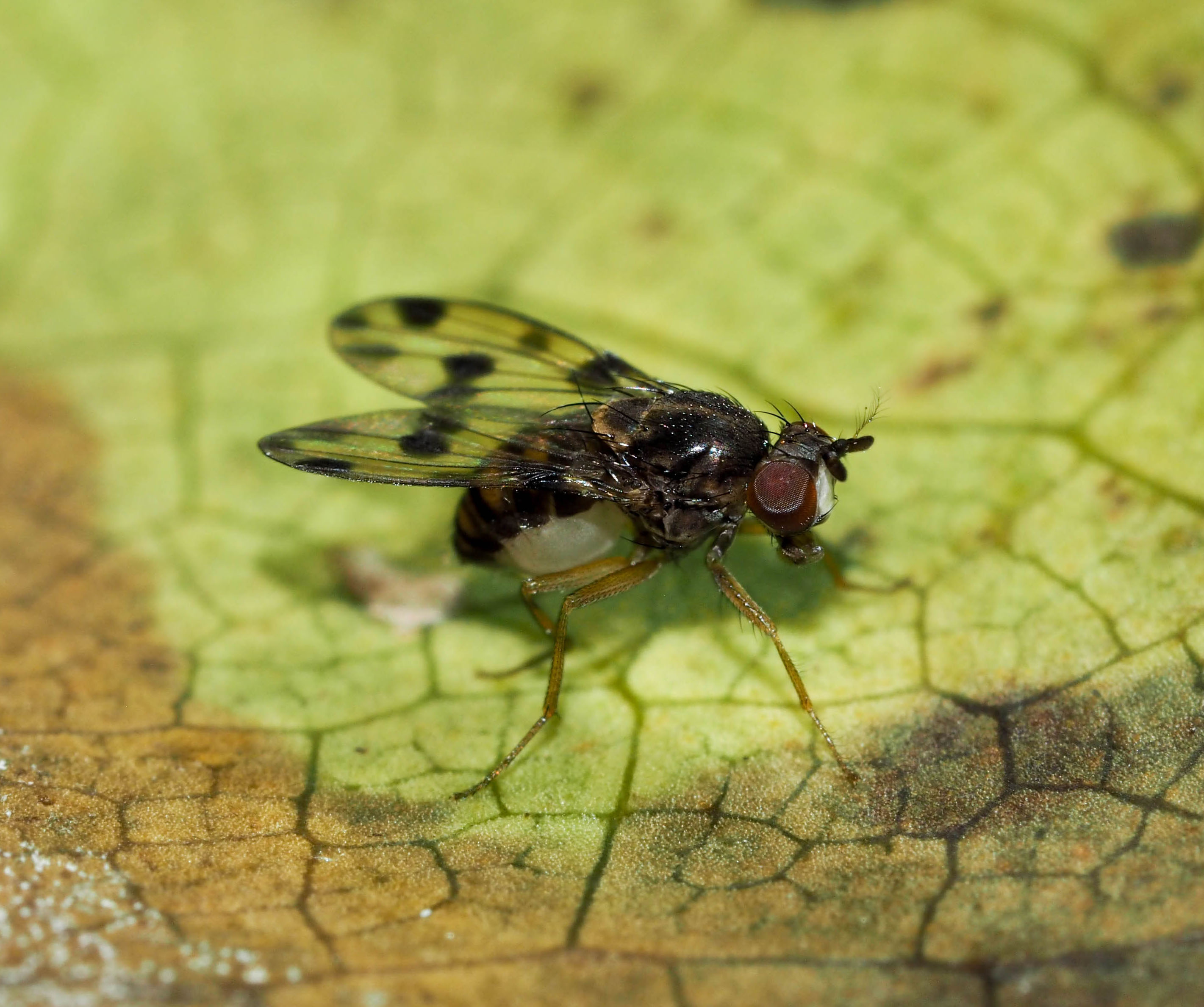
A picture-wing Hawaiian fly, Drosophila glabriapex

The picture-wing clade of Hawaiian Drosophila is named for the intricate patterns of melanin pigment on their wings. This clade includes the grimshawi, planitibia, and adiastola species groups, among others.

Research on the taxonomy and biology of picture-wing flies in the 1970's led to the description of 105 species, with several more described in the decades since. More recent studies on variation in wing patterns has led to the generation of a database devoted solely to wing diversity in the Hawaiian Drosophila lineage. These flies have also been extensively studied for their courtship behavior, potential for hybridization between species, and larval ecology. Many species of picture-wing flies breed in rotting bark and stems.

==== Antopocerus, modified-tarsus, ciliated-tarsus (AMC) clade ====
The antopocerus species group includes 15 species of flies, notable for their large adult body size and egg size, as well as the prominent antennae on males. Antopocerus was previously considered as a distinct genus, before being sunk into the genus Drosophila based on their phylogenetic position within other Hawaiian lineages. Species of antopocerus flies have been described from the islands of Maui, Molokai, Lanai, Hawaii, and one species from Oahu.

The modified-tarsus species group is so named because of the variation in the shape and structure of front tarsi of males. These tarsal modifications include flattened, spoon-shaped structures, elongated cilia, and clusters of bristles, and are thought to be used in mating displays. Antopocerus and modified-tarsus flies largely breed in rotting leaves.

==== Modified-mouthparts species group ====
The modified-mouthparts species group is named for the divergent forms of labellar structures relative to other Drosophila species. This large group of flies has received relatively less study, in part due to their rarity and because many species are not attracted to typical Drosophila baits. These flies show a remarkable diversity in breeding ecology, with the majority of species using more than one host family for larval feeding. There are more than 100 described species of modified-mouthparts flies, distributed throughout all major Hawaiian islands.

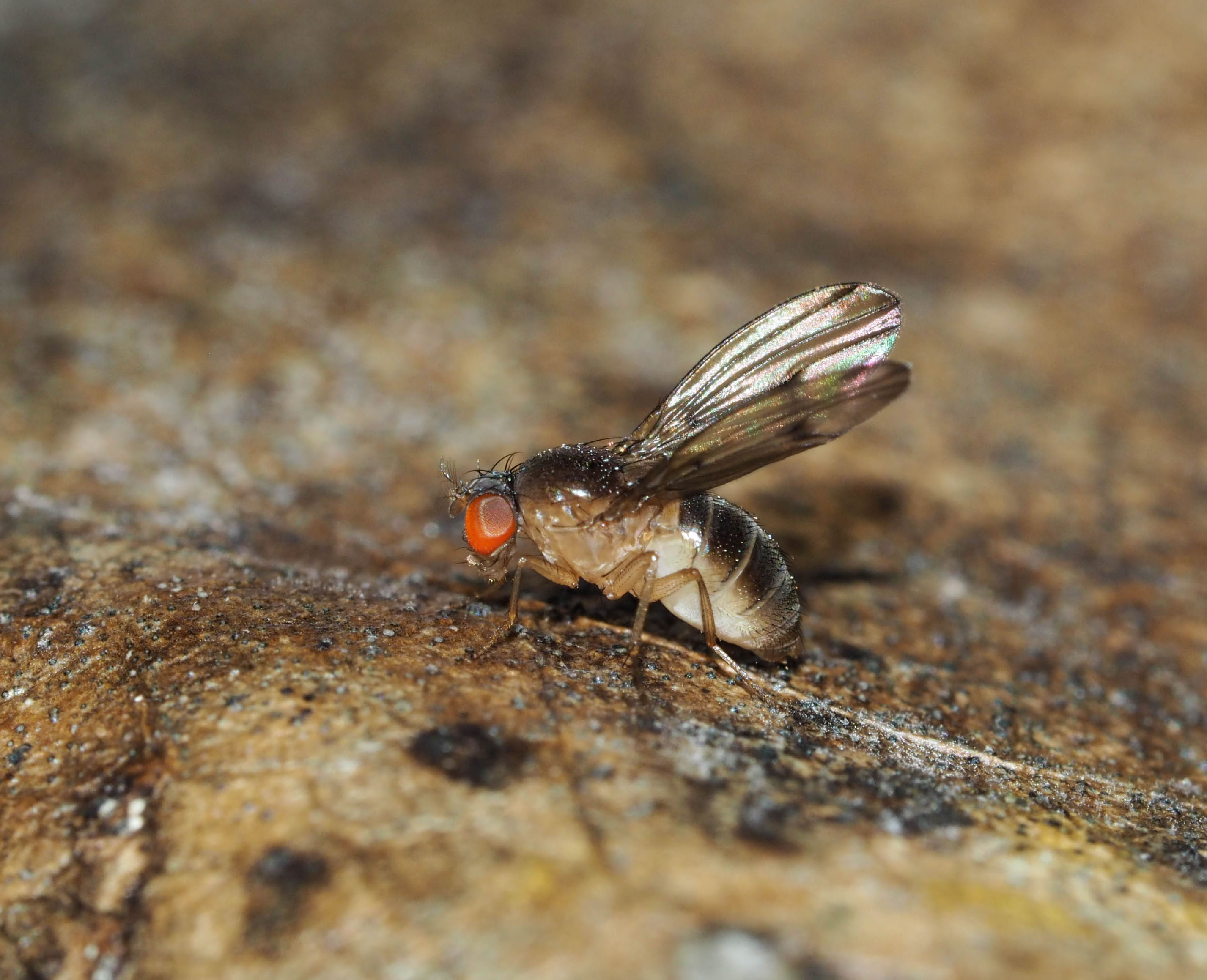
Drosophila mimica, a modified-mouthparts species

==== Haleakalae species group ====
Haleakalae species are typically small, slender, and with shiny black bodies. Rearing records indicate that members of this group breed exclusively on fungus. There are more than 50 described species of Haleakalae flies, distributed throughout all major Hawaiian islands. These species are characterized by their simple courtship displays, relative to some picture-wing species, and the short filaments on their eggs. Some species also have a black rim on the labellum.

==== Rustica species group ====
This enigmatic species group includes three species, described from Oahu, Molokai, and Hawaii, that been historically difficult to place within Hawaiian Drosophila because they display traits similar to multiple other groups. These traits include a sclerotized rim on the labellum, reminiscent of several haleakalae species, and tarsi with cilia, reminiscent of ciliated-tarsus species in the AMC clade.

== Research ==
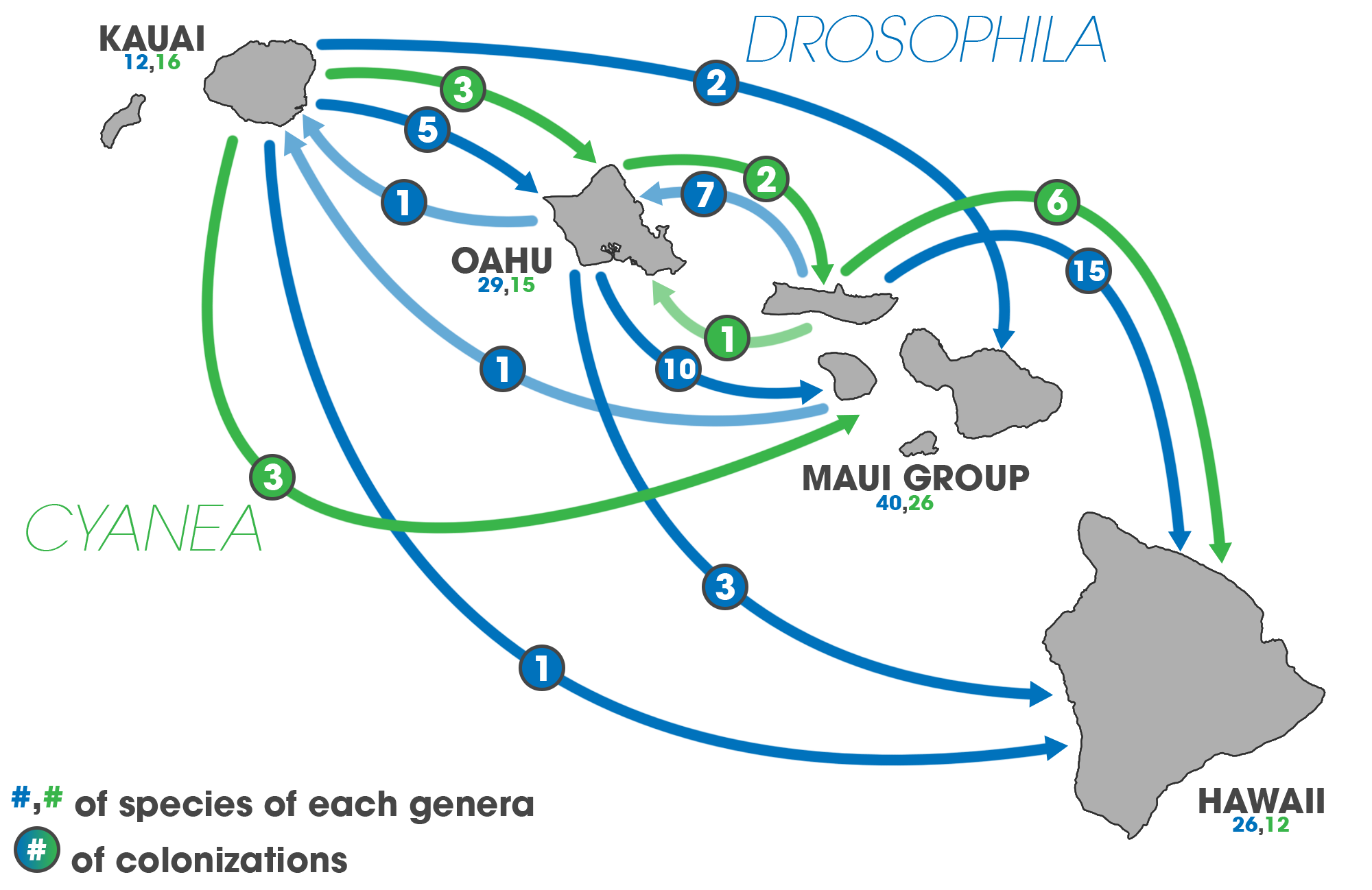
Geographical distributions of Hawaiian Drosophila species and their host plants (e.g. Cyanea) have been studied to understand evolutionary radiations on islands.

Hawaiian Drosophila have been studied as models of speciation, population genetics and genomics, as well as for evolution of behavior and evolutionary development (aka evo-devo). Research in the 1970s-80s by Hampton L. Carson and others studying patterns of chromosome banding, mating behavior, and hybridization helped resolve relationships between species and contributed to understanding of evolution on islands.

The genome of Drosophila grimshawi was selected to be one of the landmark 12 Drosophila genomes sequenced in 2007. Since then the genome size of multiple species have been investigated, revealing genomic expansions in multiple lineages composed primarily of satellite DNA and noncoding sequences.

== Ecology and reproduction ==
Like many other members of the family Drosophilidae, Hawaiian species are largely saprophagous. Female flies lay their eggs in a wide array of substrates, including rotting bark, leaves, fruit, sap, and fungi. Across species there is substantial diversity in the choice of host organism, using as many as 34 families of Hawaiian native flowering plants as hosts. Many individual species are highly host specific and breed in only one substrate type from one or a few species.

Several groups of Hawaiian Drosophilidae show more unusual breeding habits for Drosophilidae flies, such as the cytrandrae species group (Scaptomyza cyrtandrae and S. neocyrtandrae), which breed on fresh Cytrandra leaves, and the Scaptomyza subgenus Titanochaeta, which breed in spider egg sacs.

There is significant variation in reproductive morphology across species, including the number of ovarioles in the ovary, the shape of the ovipositor, and the size and shape of eggs. Research on the evolution of these traits suggests that variation is related to differences in the substrate where flies lay eggs.

== Status and conservation ==
Surveys of species abundance over time have shown a general decline in the number of Hawaiian Drosophilidae flies, along with other organisms in the native Hawaiian ecosystem. Currently 13 species are listed as federally endangered: Drosophila aglaia, D. differens, D. digressa, D. hemipeza, D. heteroneura, D. montgomeryi, D. musaphilia, D. neoclavisetae, D. obatai, D. ochrobasis, D. sharpi, D. substenoptera, and D. tarphytrichia. One species, D. mulli, is listed as threatened.

Threats to the conservation of Hawaiian Drosophilidae include loss-of-habitat, in part due to invasive pigs, goats, rats, deer, and cattle, as well as introduced predators such as big-headed ants, yellow crazy ants, and yellowjacket wasps. In addition, invasive plants such as Psidium cattleianum, Lantana camara, Melinis minutiflora, and Rubus argutus can overwhelm native host plant species and outcompete them for access to sunlight. Flammable grass species such as Melinis minutiflora also contribute to rapidly spreading forest fires. These threats are especially relevant because many native host plants for Hawaiian Drosophilidae are already very rare.

== Species groups ==
The following is a list of species groups contained within the Hawaiian Drosophilidae lineage:

- Scaptomyza genus (273 described species)
- Hawaiian Drosophila (416 described species)
  - antopocerus, modified-tarsus, ciliated tarsus (AMC) clade
    - antopocerus species group
    - modified-tarsus species group
  - picture-wing, nudidrosophila, ateledrosophila (PNA) clade
    - adiastola species group
    - grimshawi species group
    - ateledrosophila species group
    - nudidrosophila species group
    - picticornis species group
    - planitibia species group
  - haleakalae species group
  - modified-mouthpart species group
  - rustica species group

== Gallery ==
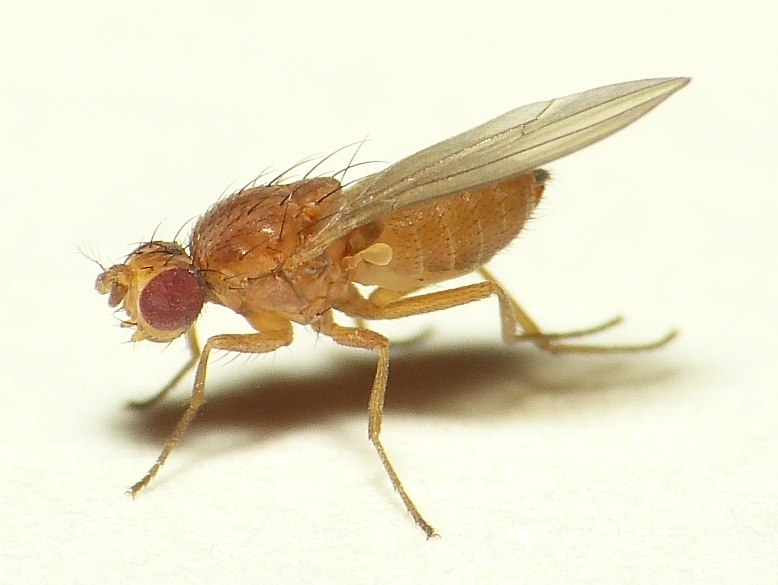
Scaptomyza flava

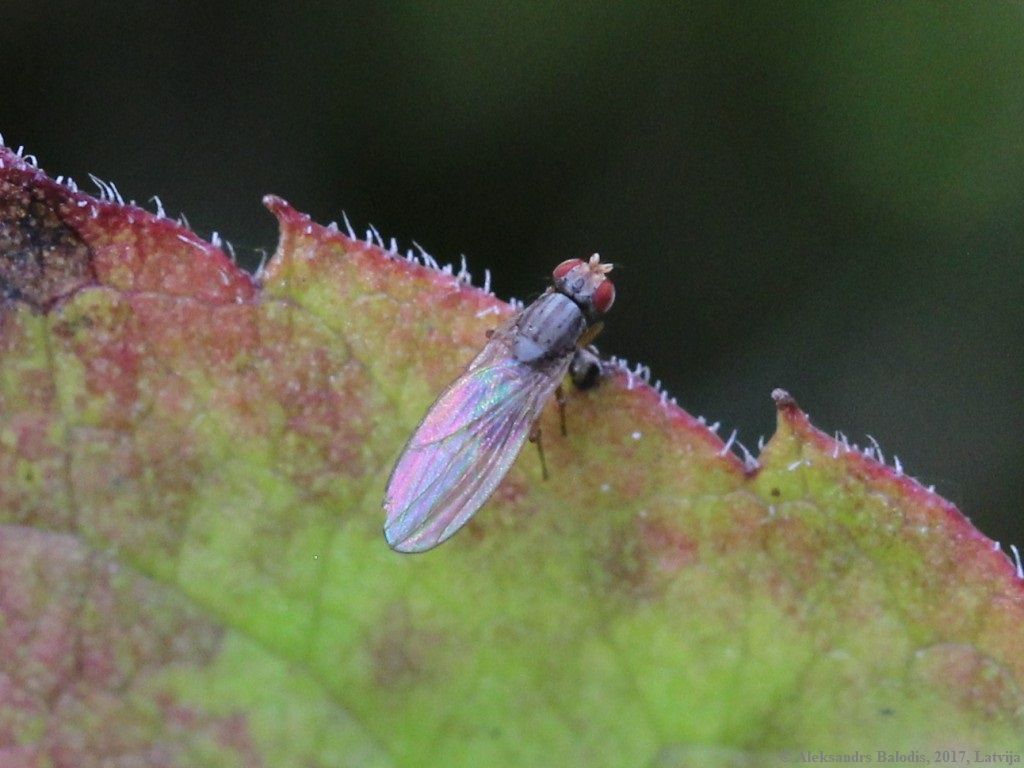
Scaptomyza pallida

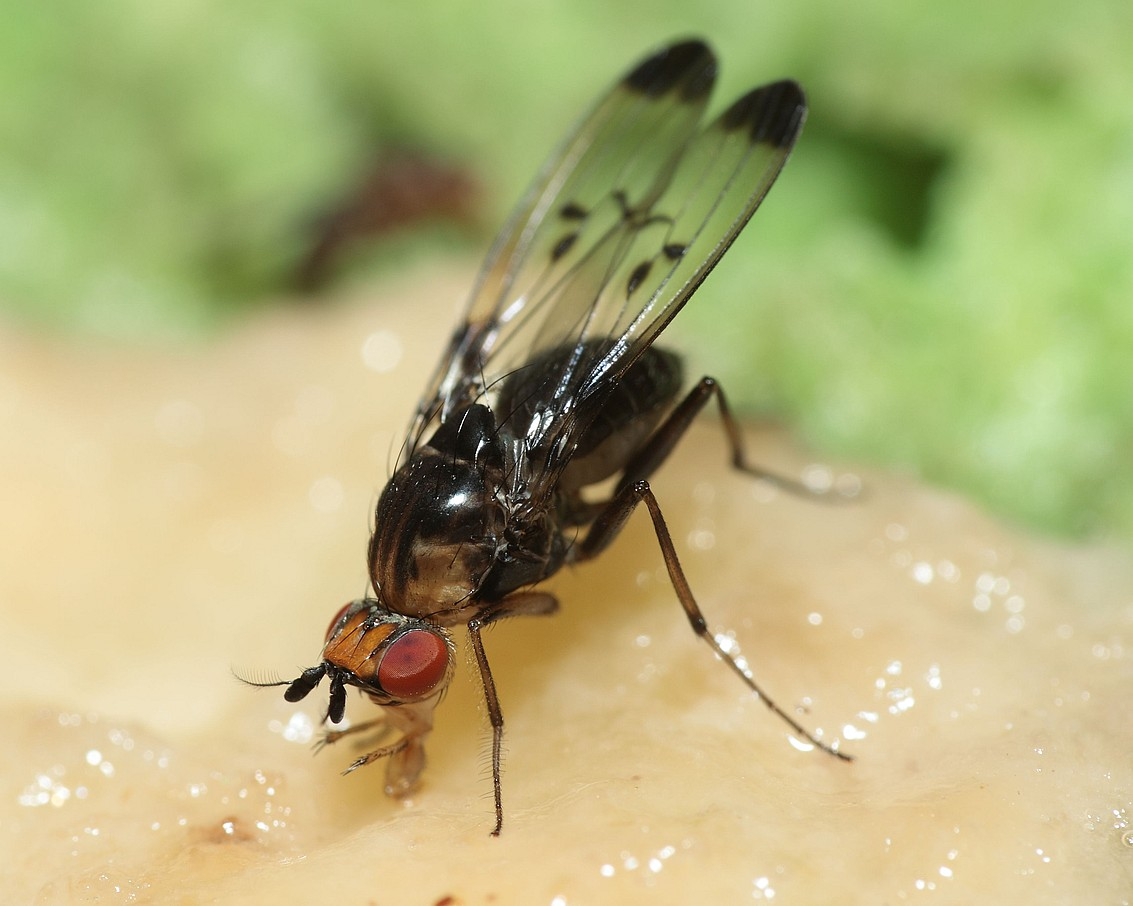
Drosophila silvestris

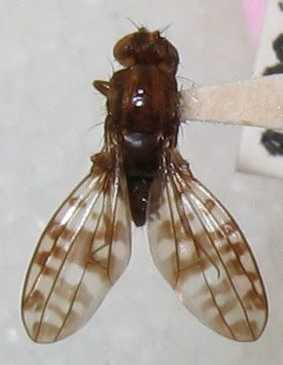
Drosophila setosimentum

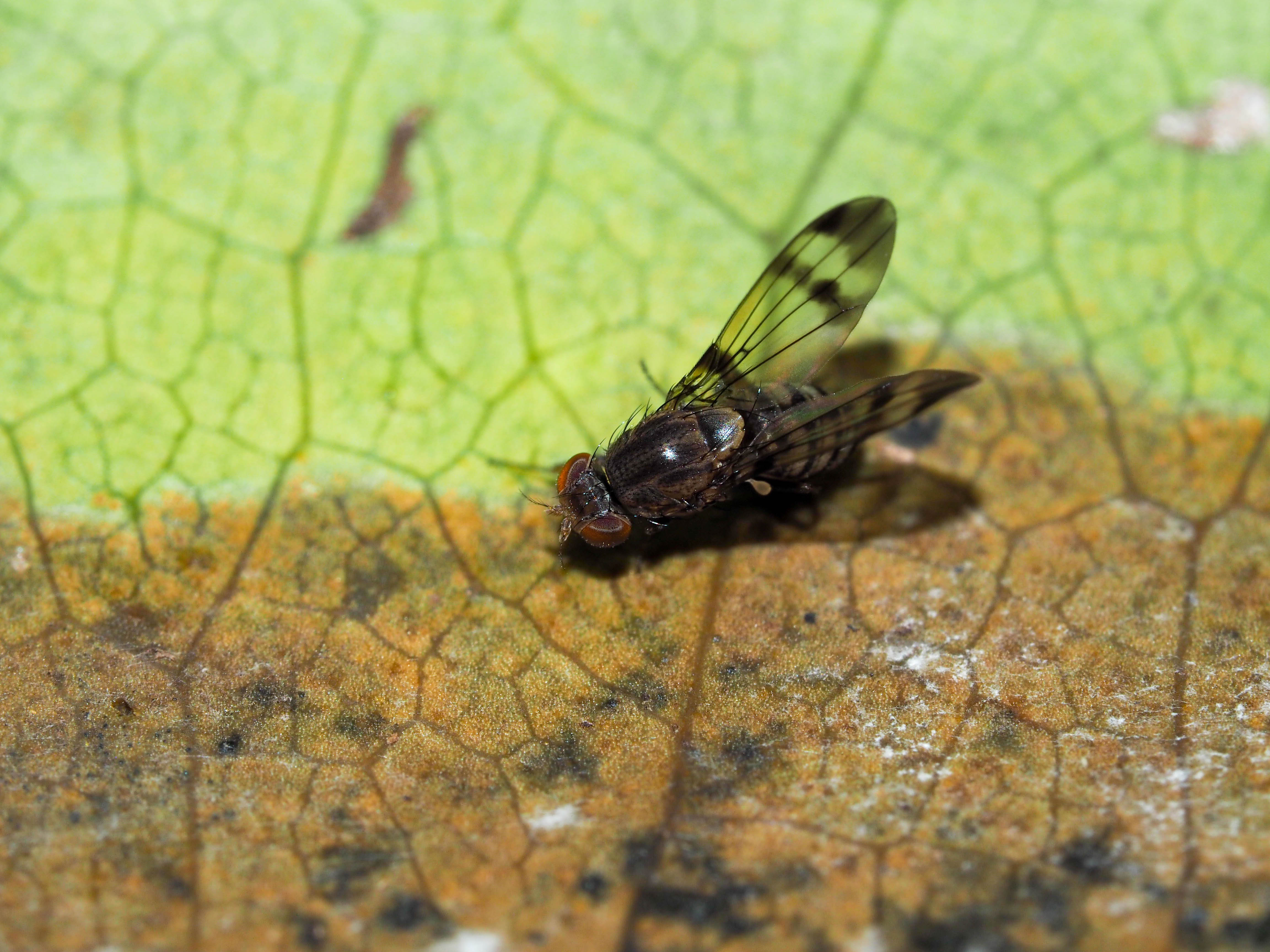
Drosophila villosipedis

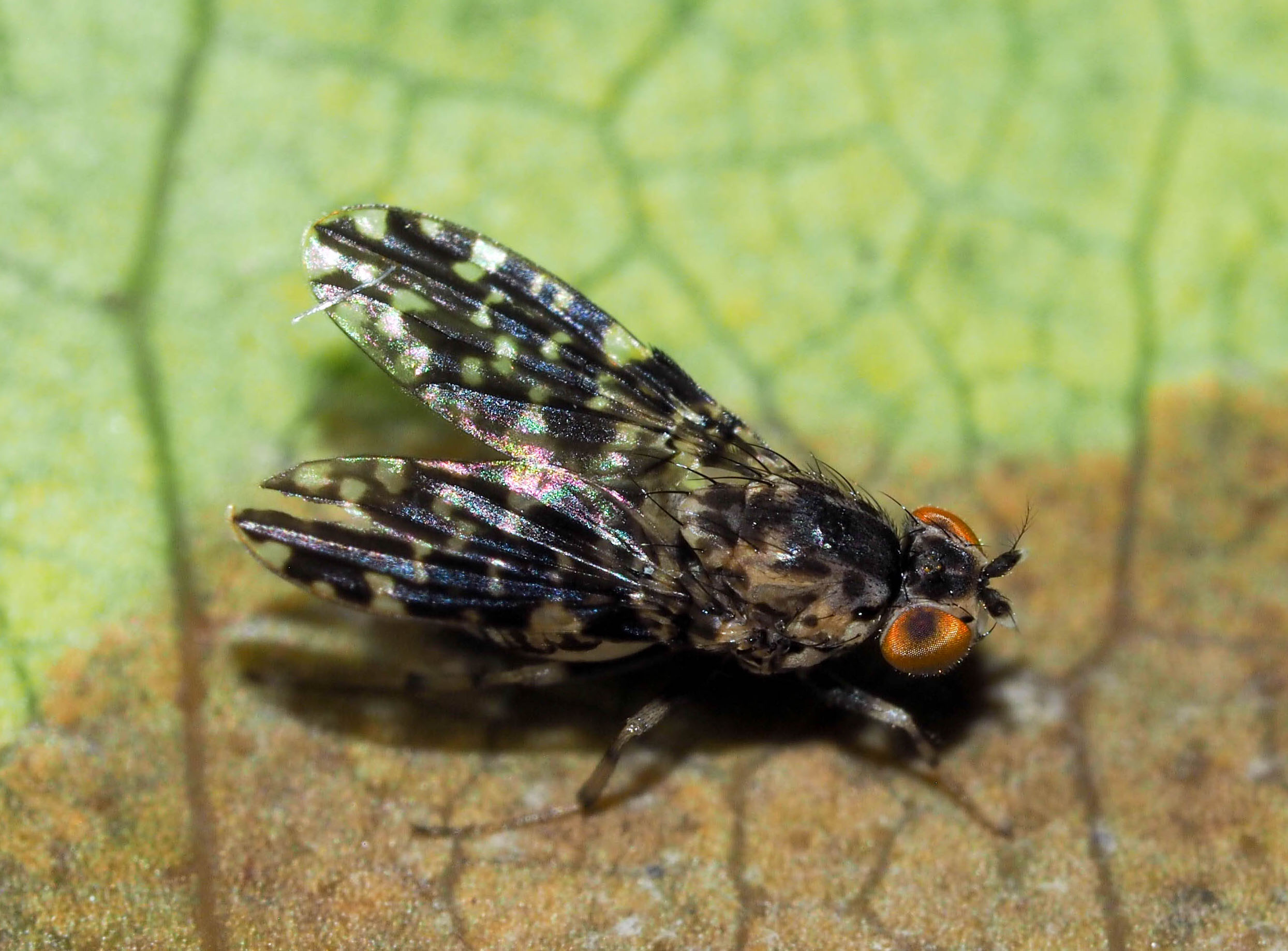
Drosophila picticornis

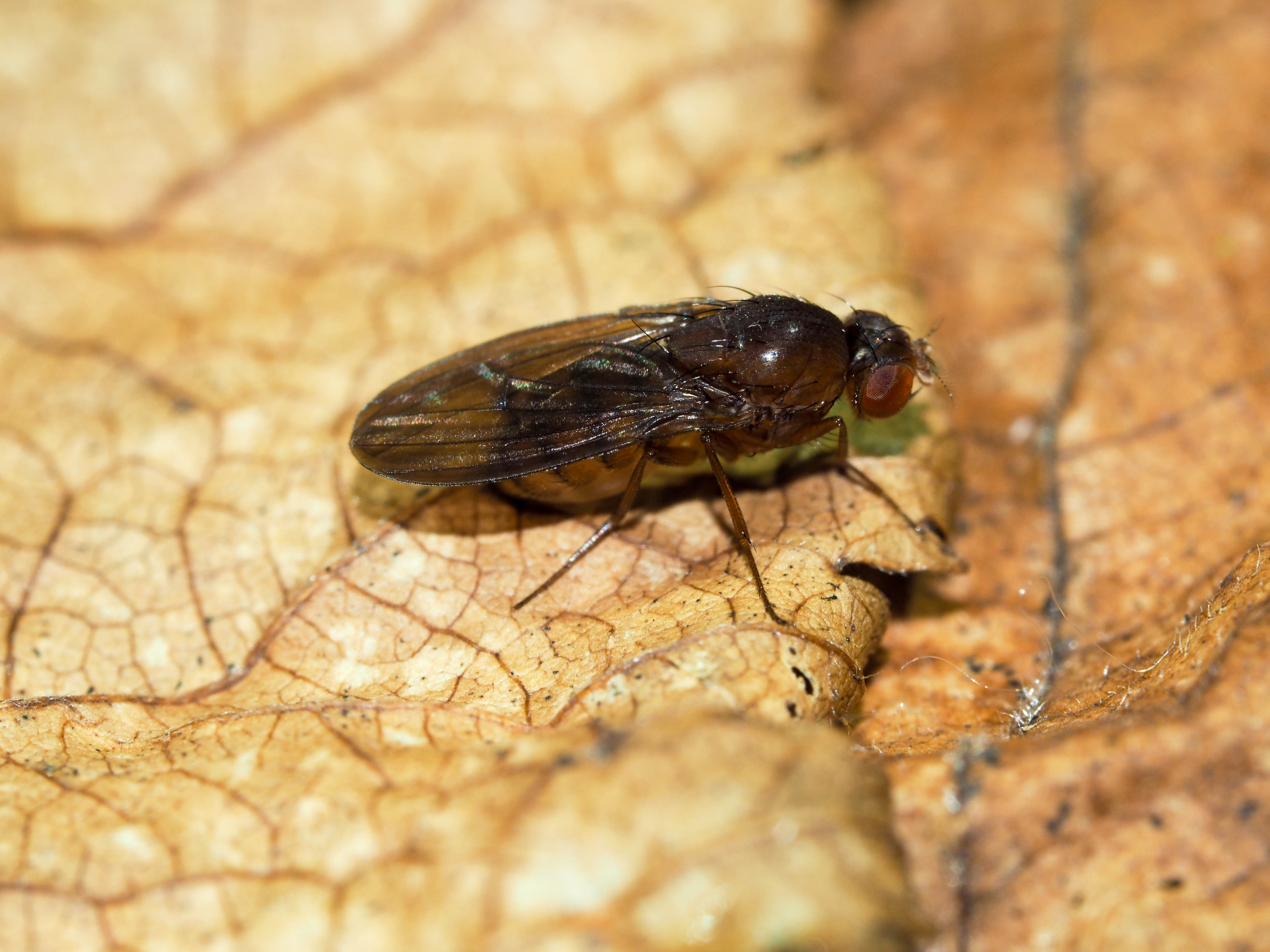
Drosophila primaeva

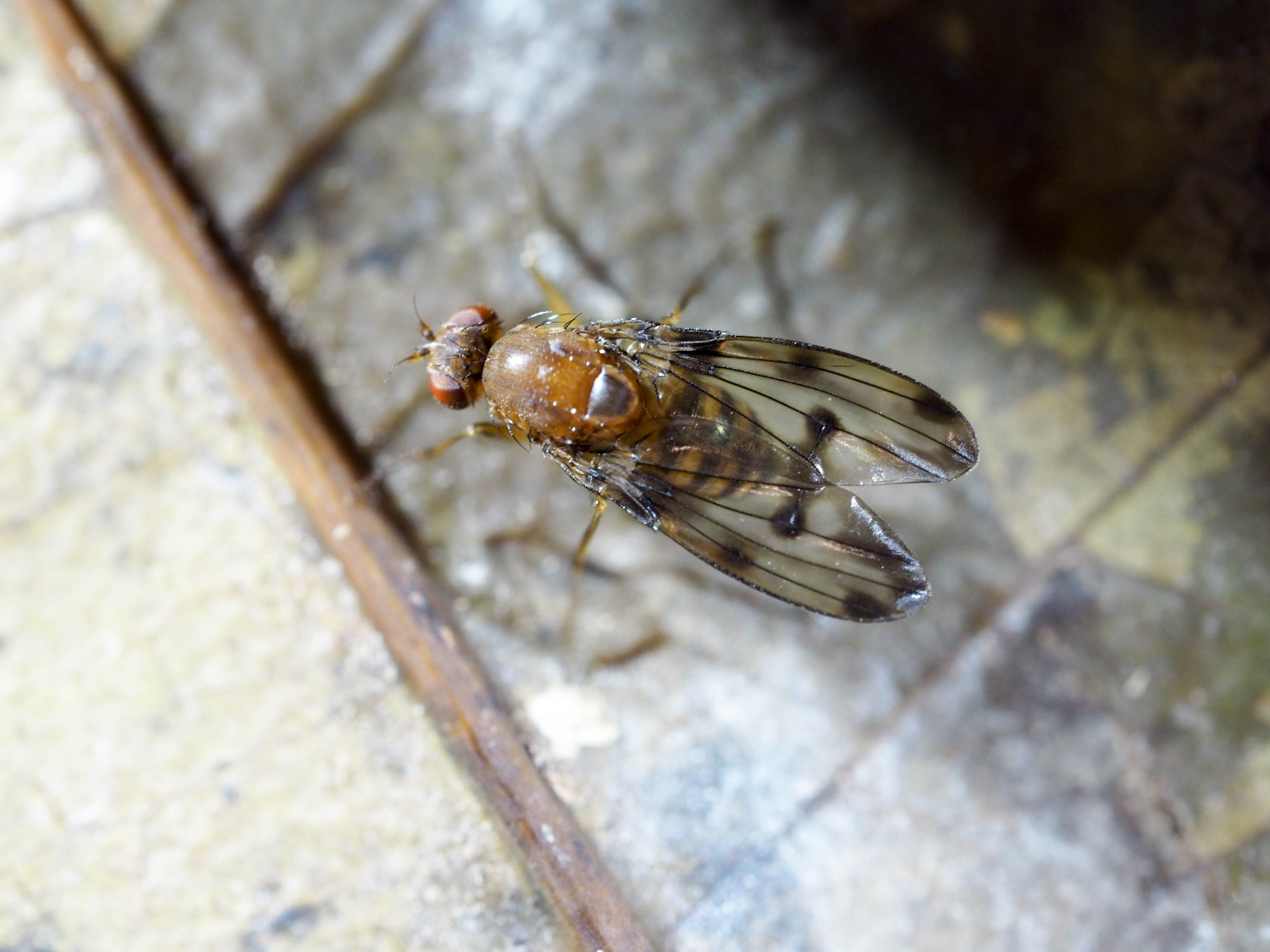
Drosophila sproati

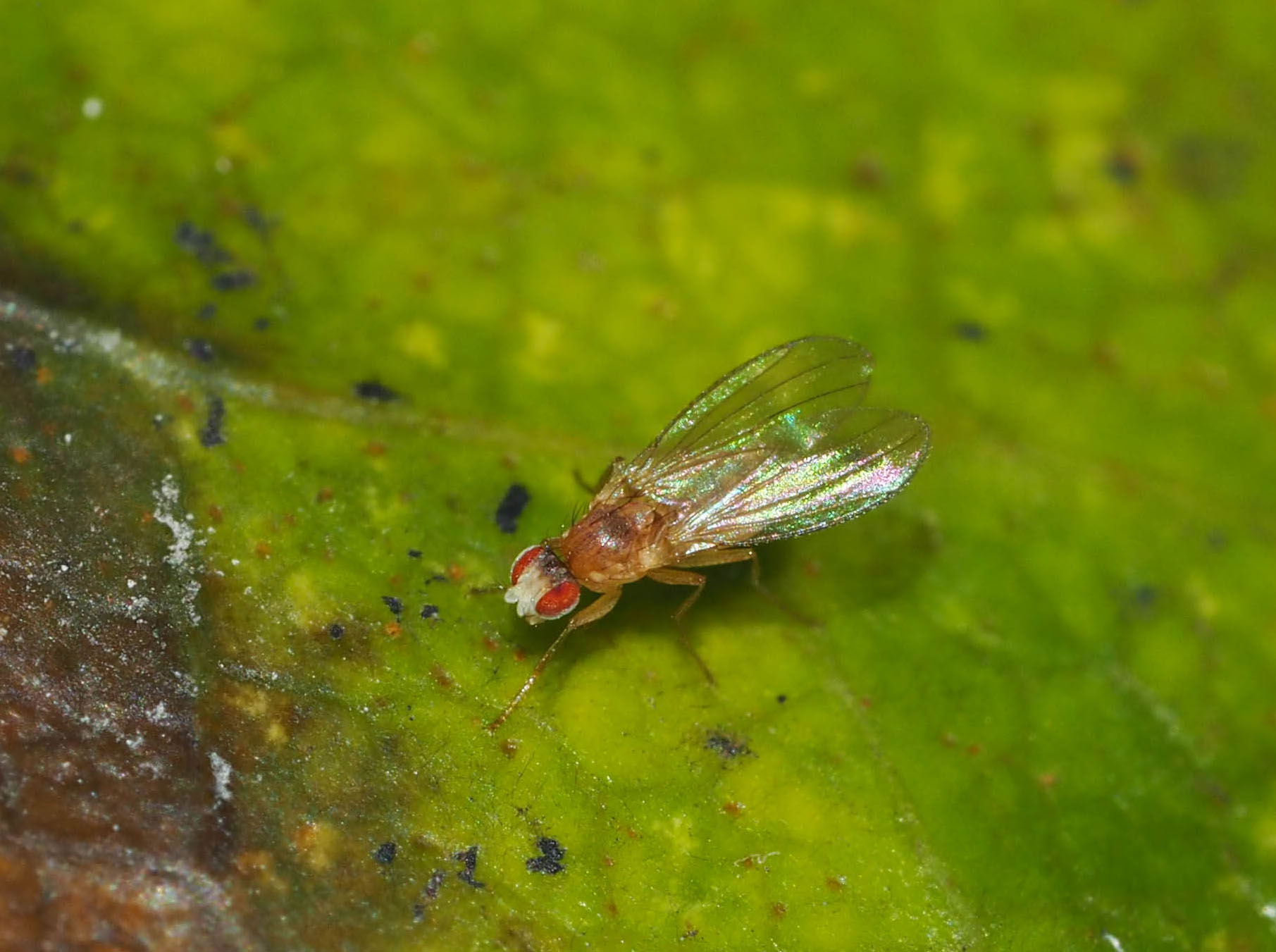
Scaptomyza cyrtandrae

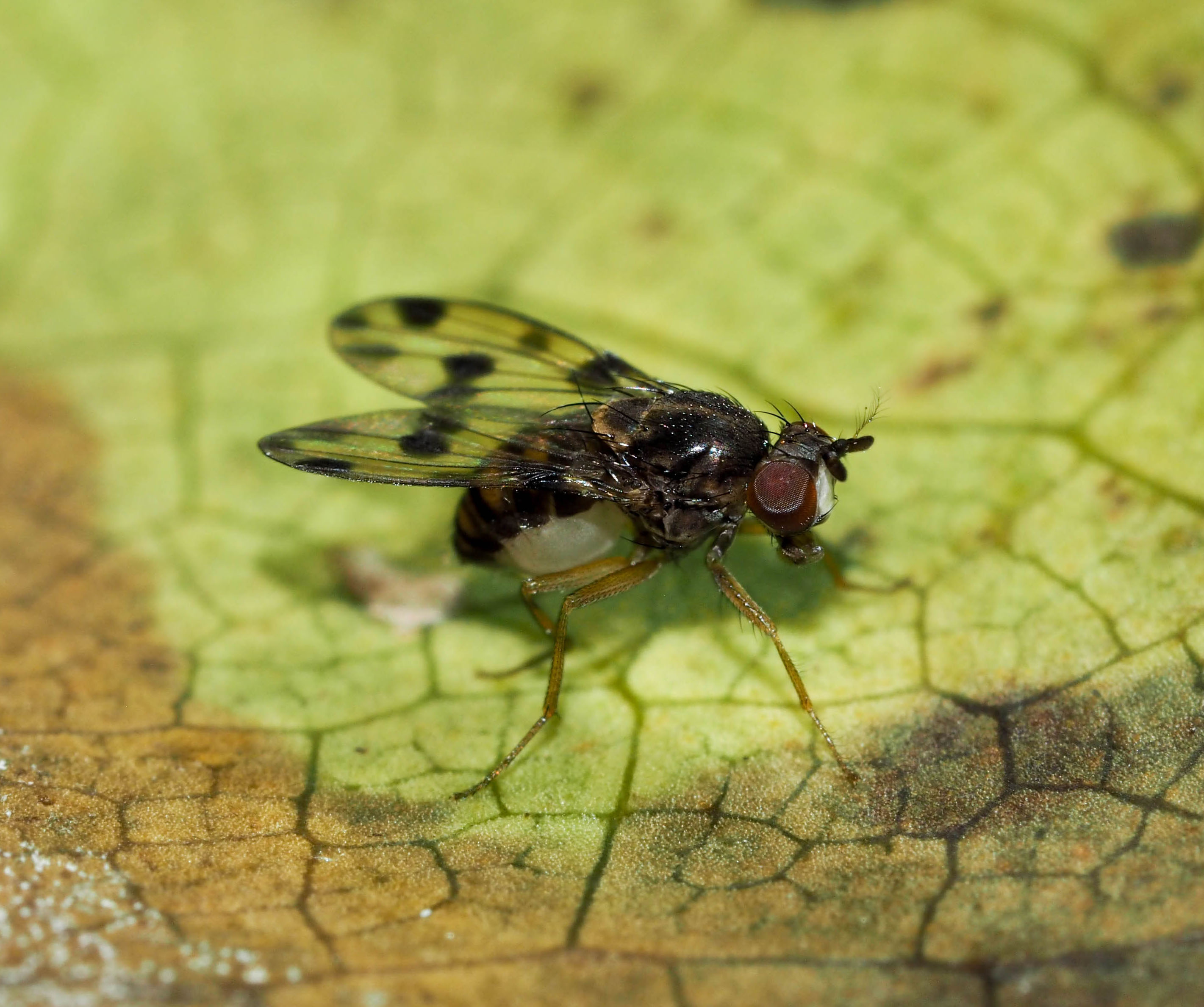
Drosophila glabriapex

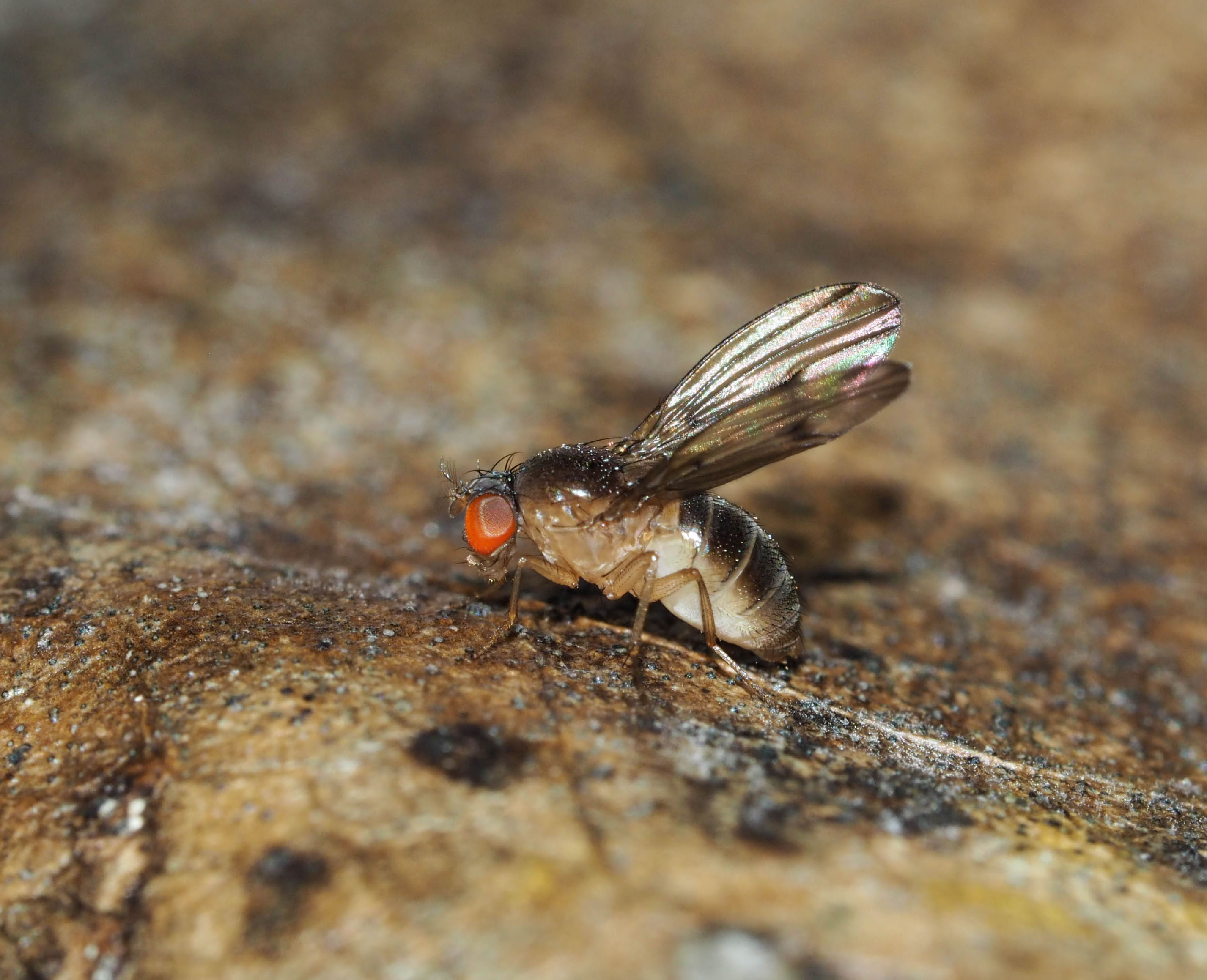
Drosophila mimica
