= Drosophila tarphytrichia =

Conservation status
- Endangered (ESA)

Scientific classification
- Kingdom: Animalia
- Phylum: Arthropoda
- Class: Insecta
- Order: Diptera
- Family: Drosophilidae
- Genus: Drosophila
- Species: D. tarphytrichia

Binomial name
- Drosophila tarphytrichia (Hardy, 1965)

Endangered Hawaiian fly

Drosophila tarphytrichia is an endangered species of fly from Hawaii, in the species rich lineage of Hawaiian Drosophilidae. It is only found on the island of Oahu. While originally collected near Manoa Falls in 1949, this fly is thought to have been extirpated from the Koʻolau Range and now only found in the Waiʻanae Range. This species is a member of the lanaiensis subgroup in the picture-wing clade.

== Description ==
Drosophila tarphytrichia was described in 1965 by D. Elmo Hardy. The picture-wing markings in this and other closely related species are located in a stripe along the center and at the apex of the wing. It is distinguished from closely related species by a flattened front tarsal segment with a dense clump of hair. These flies are predominantly yellow, with some red and brown coloration on the thorax.

Drosophila tarphytrichia is known to breed in the rotting stems and branches of pāpala plants (Charpentiera).

This species has been variously considered as part of the hawaiensis complex, vesciseta subgroup, and conspicua subgroup, but recent phylogenetic analyses have established it as a member of the lanaiensis subgroup, along with D. digressa, D. hexachetae, D. lanaiensis, and D. moli.

== Conservation ==
Drosophila tarphytrichia was listed as federally endangered in 2006 along with ten other species of picture-wing Drosophila. Threats to the conservation of D. tarphytrichia include loss-of-habitat, in part due to invasive pigs and goats, as well as introduced predators such as big-headed ants and yellow crazy ants.
