= Drosophila hemipeza =

Conservation status
- Endangered (ESA)

Scientific classification
- Kingdom: Animalia
- Phylum: Arthropoda
- Clade: Pancrustacea
- Class: Insecta
- Order: Diptera
- Family: Drosophilidae
- Genus: Drosophila
- Species: D. hemipeza

Binomial name
- Drosophila hemipeza (Hardy, 1965)

Synonyms
- Idiomyia hemipeza Hardy, 1965

Endangered Hawaiian fly

Drosophila hemipeza is an endangered species of Hawaiian fly in the family Drosophilidae. This species is a member of the planitiba subgroup of the picture-wing clade of Hawaiian Drosophila.

== Description ==
Drosophila hemipeza flies are yellow with two brown dorsal stripes, slender legs, and relatively long, slightly pointed, wings. These flies are only found in native mesic forest on the island of Oahu. They have been recorded breeding on bark from opuhe (Urera kaalae), as well as on plants in the genera Cyanea and Lobelia.

This species was described by D. Elmo Hardy in 1965 as Idiomyia hemipeza. Its name was changed when Idiomyia was merged into the genus Drosophila by Hampton L. Carson and others in 1967.

== Conservation ==
Drosophila hemipeza was listed as federally endangered in 2006 along with ten other species of picture-wing Drosophila. Threats to the conservation of D. hemipeza include loss-of-habitat, in part due to invasive pigs and goats, as well as introduced predators such as big-headed ants, yellow crazy ants, and yellowjacket wasps. In addition, the host plants of D. hemipeza are increasingly rare (opuhe is also listed as critically endangered).
