= Drosophila ochrobasis =

Conservation status
- Endangered (ESA)

Scientific classification
- Kingdom: Animalia
- Phylum: Arthropoda
- Clade: Pancrustacea
- Class: Insecta
- Order: Diptera
- Family: Drosophilidae
- Genus: Drosophila
- Species: D. ochrobasis

Binomial name
- Drosophila ochrobasis (Hardy and Kaneshiro, 1968)

Endangered Hawaiian fly

Drosophila ochrobasis is an endangered species of fly from Hawaii, in the species rich lineage of Hawaiian Drosophilidae. It is found on the Big island of Hawaii, and has historically been recorded from four of the five volcanoes (Kohala, Mauna Kea, Mauna Loa, and Hualālai), though it is now largely absent from most of those sites. This species is in the adiastola subgroup and is closely related to D. setosimentum, but male D. ochrobasis have strikingly different wing markings.

== Description ==
Drosophila ochrobasis was described in 1968 by D. Elmo Hardy and Kenneth Y. Kaneshiro. This fly is largely yellow-brown, with red eyes, a yellow front, and a white face. The upper margins of the eyes are usually blackened. Male and female D. ochrobasis have distinct wing markings from one another. Male wings are clear basally and dark apically, with two hyaline spots toward the apex. The female wing looks similar to D. setosimentum, with a somewhat checkerboard pattern of spots along the wings.

This species has been recorded breeding in plant species from three families: in the leaves of Myrsine lessertiana (Myrsinaceae), roots of Clermontia sp. (Campanulaceae), and rachis of Marattia douglasii (Marattiaceae). It is not clear to what extent these rearing records represent major or incidental hosts.

== Conservation ==
Drosophila ochrobasis was listed as federally endangered in 2006 along with ten other species of picture-wing Drosophila. Threats to the conservation of D. ochrobasis include loss-of-habitat, in part due to invasive pigs, goats, cattle, and rats, all of which are known to feed on host plants. Additionally these flies face predation from introduced insects such as big-headed ants, yellow crazy ants, and yellowjacket wasps.

Invasive plants, such as Psidium cattleianum, Passiflora mollissima, Pennisetum setaceum, and Rubus argutus, also threaten the conservation of D. ochrobasis and other members of the native Hawaiian ecosystem. These plants can overwhelm native species and outcompete them for access to light. Flammable species such as P. setaceum also contribute to rapidly spreading fires.
