= Drosophila obatai =

Conservation status
- Endangered (ESA)

Scientific classification
- Kingdom: Animalia
- Phylum: Arthropoda
- Clade: Pancrustacea
- Class: Insecta
- Order: Diptera
- Family: Drosophilidae
- Genus: Drosophila
- Species: D. obatai

Binomial name
- Drosophila obatai (Hardy and Kaneshiro, 1972)

Endangered Hawaiian fly

Drosophila obatai is an endangered species of fly from Hawaii, in the species rich lineage of Hawaiian Drosophilidae. It is only found on the island of Oahu. D. obatai is part of the orphnopeza subgroup in the picture-wing clade, and is closely related to D. sodomae, a fly found on the islands of Maui and Molokai.

== Description ==
D. obatai was described in 1972 by D. Elmo Hardy and Kenneth Y. Kaneshiro, from specimens collected in the Waiʻanae Range. This fly can be distinguished from its Maui Nui relative, D. sodomae, by having a brown spot at the base of the wing that covers most of the cell Sc, and by darker black markings on the abdomen, compared to brown markings in D. sodomae.

This species has been found breeding in the bark and stems of hala pepe (formerly Pleomele species, now included in the genus Dracaena).

D. obatai is named after John K. Obata, a local school teacher and botanist who is credited with being directly responsible for the discovery of many new species, habitats, and host plant associations. The species description of D. obatai refers to Mr. Obata as an "enthusiastic field man" who "knows the trails and endemic plants of Oahu exceptionally well and has worked closely with [the] collectors".

== Conservation ==
Drosophila obatai was listed as federally endangered in 2006 along with ten other species of picture-wing Drosophila. Threats to the conservation of this species include loss-of-habitat, in part due to invasive pigs and goats, as well as introduced predators such as big-headed ants, yellow crazy ants, and yellowjacket wasps. An additional threat to the conservation of D. obatai is that at least one of its host plants, Dracaena forbesii, is also very rare and has been listed as federally endangered.
