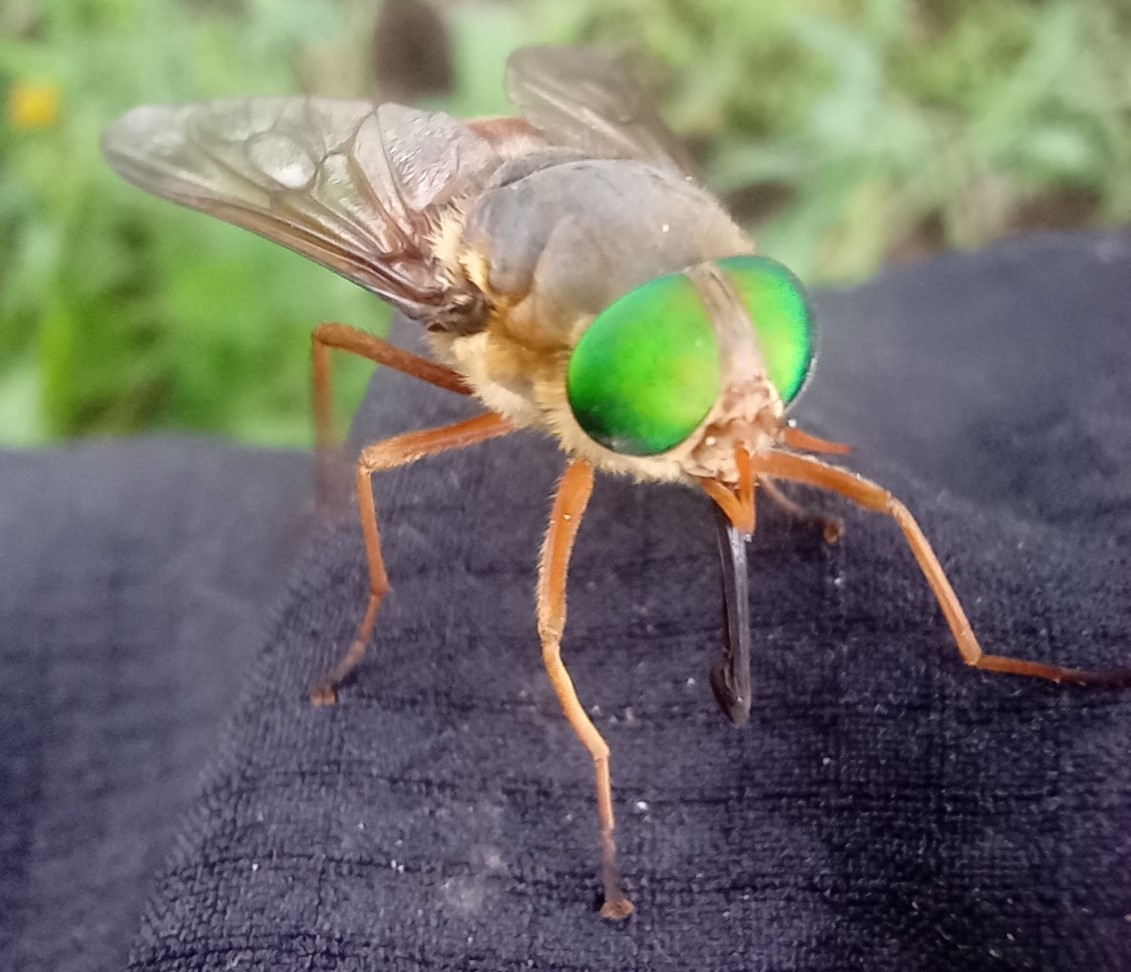

Scientific classification
- Kingdom: Animalia
- Phylum: Arthropoda
- Clade: Pancrustacea
- Class: Insecta
- Order: Diptera
- Family: Tabanidae
- Subfamily: Tabaninae
- Tribe: Tabanini
- Genus: Tabanus
- Species: T. australicus

Binomial name
- Tabanus australicus Taylor 1919

= Tabanus australicus =

Species of fly

Tabanus australicus, commonly known as Australian common March fly, is a species of horse-fly in the genus Tabanus. It is endemic to Australia and found in the Queensland area.

The species was first identified by Australian entomologist Frank Henry Taylor (1886–1945) in 1919. It was incorrectly identified as Tabanus queenslandii by Ferguson in 1920.

It is blackish-brown in colour, 13–15 mm (0.51–0.59 in) in length, with 10 mm (0.39 in) grey wings. The ocelli is rudimentary or absent, the antennal flagellum usually with a basal plate and 4-annulate. On the wings the basicosta are without setulate, and the proboscis is relatively stout with large labella.

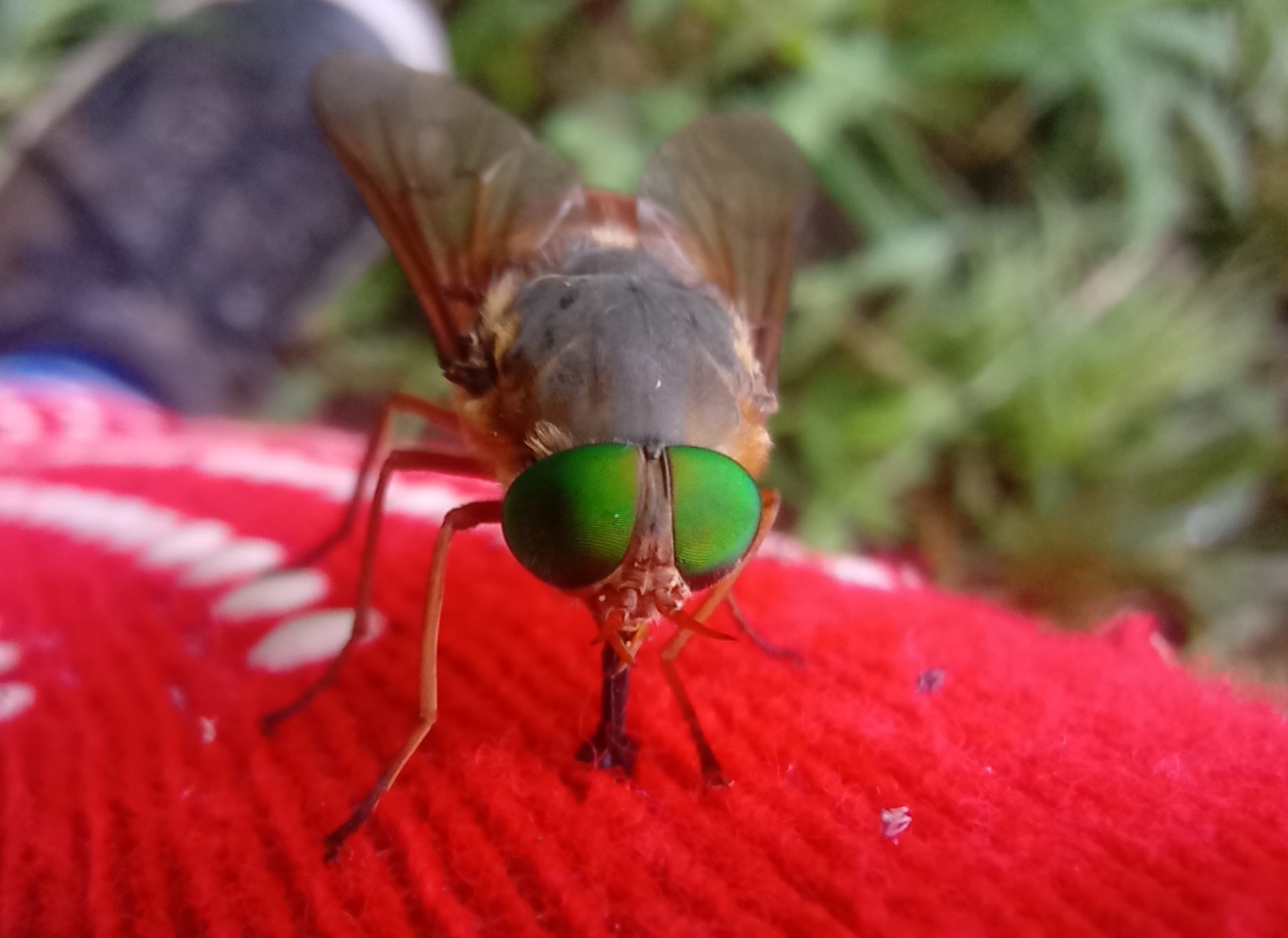
Tabanus australicus

== See also ==
- List of Tabanus species
