= Drosophila heteroneura =

Conservation status
- Endangered (ESA)

Scientific classification
- Domain: Eukaryota
- Kingdom: Animalia
- Phylum: Arthropoda
- Class: Insecta
- Order: Diptera
- Family: Drosophilidae
- Genus: Drosophila
- Species: D. heteroneura

Binomial name
- Drosophila heteroneura (Perkins, 1910)

Synonyms
- Idiomyia heteroneura Perkins, 1910

Endangered Hawaiian fly

Drosophila heteroneura is an endangered species of Hawaiian fly in the family Drosophilidae. This rare fly is part of the Hawaiian Drosophila lineage, and is only found in mesic and wet forests on the island of Hawaii.

== Description ==
Male D. heteroneura flies have large, wide heads that give them a hammerhead appearance. These flies are predominantly yellow with black stripes, and characteristic brown spots at the base and tips of the wings. Their abdomens are shiny and black with yellow spots on the sides of each segment.

This species was described by R. C. L. Perkins in 1910 as Idiomyia heteroneura, and its name was changed when Idiomyia was merged into the genus Drosophila by Hampton L. Carson and others in 1967.

D. heteroneura breeds primarily in the rotting bark and stems of species in the genus Clermontia, but has been recorded breeding in Cheirodendron as well.

== Hybridization ==
Drosophila heteroneura is a member of the planitiba subgroup of the picture-wing clade of Hawaiian Drosophila. This species is closely related to D. silvestris, with which they are known to produce fertile hybrid offspring in the wild. D. heteroneura can also produce hybrid offspring with D. planitibia from Maui, another closely related species, but only female hybrid offspring are fertile.

Behavioral studies of D. heteroneura and D. silvestris in the laboratory show that a significant obstacle to hybridization is that D. heteroneura females show preference against D. silvestris males during courtship. However, these studies also show that, while the wide head of D. heteroneura appears to be a sexually selected trait, it is likely not the primary mechanism for female species recognition.

== Conservation ==
The number of observations of Drosophila heteroneura has declined significantly in recent decades. Where surveys between 1975 and 1979 found the fly more than seven hundred times, surveys ten years later failed to find any wild populations. Since then, a handful of small populations have been found at several sites on the island.
