= Drosophila montgomeryi =

Conservation status
- Endangered (ESA)

Scientific classification
- Kingdom: Animalia
- Phylum: Arthropoda
- Class: Insecta
- Order: Diptera
- Family: Drosophilidae
- Genus: Drosophila
- Species: D. montgomeryi

Binomial name
- Drosophila montgomeryi (Hardy and Kaneshiro, 1971)

Endangered Hawaiian fly

Drosophila montgomeryi is an endangered species of fly from the lineage of Hawaiian Drosophilidae. It is found on the island of Oahu.

== Description ==
Drosophila montgomeryi was described in 1971 by D. Elmo Hardy and Kenneth Kaneshiro from specimens collected from the Waianae mountains.

D. montgomeryi, like other species in the vesciseta subgroup of picture-wing flies, has a mostly rufous thorax and wings with a prominent dark spot in the cell R1. It can be distinguished from the similar species D. pisonia by a narrow, brown stripe on each side of the thorax, among other characters.

== Conservation ==
Drosophila montgomeryi was listed as federally endangered in 2006 along with ten other species of picture-wing Drosophila. One threat to the conservation of D. montgomeryi is that at least one of its host plants, Urera kaalae, is also very rare and has been listed as federally endangered.
