= Drosophila aglaia =

Conservation status
- Endangered (ESA)

Scientific classification
- Kingdom: Animalia
- Phylum: Arthropoda
- Clade: Pancrustacea
- Class: Insecta
- Order: Diptera
- Family: Drosophilidae
- Genus: Drosophila
- Species: D. aglaia

Binomial name
- Drosophila aglaia (Hardy, 1965)

Endangered Hawaiian fly

Drosophila aglaia is an endangered species of fly from Hawaii. This species is a member of the aglaia subgroup of the picture-wing clade of Hawaiian Drosophilidae. It is only found on the island of Oahu, and has not been observed since 1997, when it was found in Palikea.

== Description ==
Drosophila aglaia was described in 1965 by D. Elmo Hardy from specimens collected by O. H. Sweezey from Kilauae in 1917, and by G. B. Mainland from Kaala in 1946. This fly is described as predominantly yellow with brown eyes, three brown stripes on the top of the thorax, and characteristic brown markings on the wings. The abdomen is also brown with two yellow spots. Drosophila kikiko from the island of Kauai is described as nearly identical to D. aglaia.

While originally reported as breeding on the bark and stems of Urera glabra, these records have since been attributed to the species Drosophila kinoole. The actual host plant of D. aglaia is unknown.

== Conservation ==
Drosophila aglaia was listed as federally endangered in 2006 along with ten other species of picture-wing Drosophila. Threats to the conservation of D. aglaia include loss-of-habitat, in part due to invasive pigs and goats, as well as introduced predators such as big-headed ants, yellow crazy ants, and yellowjacket wasps.
