= Drosophila digressa =

Conservation status
- Critically Imperiled (NatureServe)

- Endangered (ESA)

Scientific classification
- Kingdom: Animalia
- Phylum: Arthropoda
- Class: Insecta
- Order: Diptera
- Family: Drosophilidae
- Genus: Drosophila
- Species: D. digressa

Binomial name
- Drosophila digressa (Hardy and Kaneshiro, 1968)

Endangered Hawaiian fly

Drosophila digressa is an endangered species of fly from Hawaii, in the species-rich lineage of Hawaiian Drosophilidae. It is only found on the Big island of Hawaii. It was historically known from sites throughout the islands, but is now restricted to the Manuka and Ola'a reserves.

== Description ==
Drosophila digressa was described by D. Elmo Hardy and Kenneth Y. Kaneshiro in 1968. This fly is yellow with two brown spots and three stripes on the thorax (the center stripe is fainter than each side). The wings have brown markings on crossveins and at the apex that are characteristic for the species.

D. digressa was originally difficult to place within the picture-wing clade, but phylogenetic studies indicate that it is part of lanaiensis subgroup, along with D. hexachaetae, D. moli, and D. lanaiensis. This clade follows the island progression rule, with speciation events following the age of formation of each island.

This species has been recorded breeding in rotting stems of Charpentiera and Pisonia species.

== Conservation ==
Drosophila digressa was listed as a federally endangered species in 2013. Threats to the conservation of D. digressa include loss of breeding habitat, and predation from introduced insects such as yellowjacket wasps.
