= Drosophila substenoptera =

Conservation status
- Endangered (ESA)

Scientific classification
- Kingdom: Animalia
- Phylum: Arthropoda
- Class: Insecta
- Order: Diptera
- Family: Drosophilidae
- Genus: Drosophila
- Species: D. substenoptera

Binomial name
- Drosophila substenoptera (Hardy, 1965)

Synonyms
- Idiomyia substenoptera Hardy, 1965

Endangered Hawaiian fly

Drosophila substenoptera is an endangered species of fly in the species rich lineage of Hawaiian Drosophilidae. It is only found on the island of Oahu,. Historically it was collected throughout the Ko'olau and Wai'anae ranges, but now is only known to occur near the summit of Mt. Kaala. D. substenoptera is a member of the planitibia species group and neopicta subgroup within the picture-wing clade.

== Description ==
This species was described by D. Elmo Hardy in 1965 as Idiomyia substenoptera. Its name was changed when Idiomyia was merged into the genus Drosophila by Hampton L. Carson and others in 1967. This fly is yellow with two black stripes on the thorax, and has narrow wings with brown markings.

D. substenoptera lives in wet forest habitat and has been recorded breeding on rotting bark from plants in the genera Cheirodendron and Tetraplasandra.

== Conservation ==
Drosophila substenoptera was listed as federally endangered in 2006 along with ten other species of picture-wing Drosophila. Threats to the conservation of this species include loss-of-habitat, in part due to invasive pigs and goats, competition for larval resources with introduced crane flies, and introduced predators such as ants and yellowjacket wasps.
