= Microbivory =

Microbivory (adj. microbivorous, microbivore) is a feeding behavior consisting of eating microbes (especially bacteria) practiced by animals of the mesofauna, microfauna and meiofauna.

Microbivorous animals include some soil nematodes, springtails or flies such as Drosophila sharpi. A well known example of microbivorous nematodes is the model roundworm Caenorhabditis elegans which is maintained in culture in labs on agar plates, fed with the 'OP50' Escherichia coli strain of bacteria.

In food webs of ecosystems, microbivores can be distinguished from detritivores, generally thought playing the roles of decomposers, as they don't consume decaying dead matter but only living microorganisms.

== Use of term in robotics ==
There is also use of the term 'microbivore' to qualify the concept of robots autonomously finding their energy in the production of bacteria. Robert Freitas has also proposed microbivore robots that would attack pathogens in the manner of white blood cells.

== See also ==
- Bacterivore
