= Drosophila musaphilia =

Conservation status
- Endangered (ESA)

Scientific classification
- Kingdom: Animalia
- Phylum: Arthropoda
- Class: Insecta
- Order: Diptera
- Family: Drosophilidae
- Genus: Drosophila
- Species: D. musaphilia

Binomial name
- Drosophila musaphilia (Hardy, 1965)

Endangered Hawaiian fly

Drosophila musaphilia is an endangered species of fly from Hawaii, in the species rich lineage of Hawaiian Drosophilidae. It is only found on the island of Kauai. The last reported sighting of this species was in 1988.

== Description ==
Drosophila musaphilia was described in 1965 by D. Elmo Hardy. The species name is in reference to the fact that this species, like many other picture-wing Drosophila, is strongly attracted to the smell of rotting banana. This species is a member of the hawaiiensis subgroup in the picture-wing clade.

D. musaphilia flies are mostly black, with gray hairs along the thorax. The wing markings are similar to other closely related species in the subgroup, with a stripe of spots along the center and apex of the wing.

D. musaphilia females have the second longest ovipositor recorded from species of Hawaiian Drosophila, second to D. orphnopeza, with both species measuring at >1 millimeter. Rearing records for this species indicate that it breeds in rotting sap, known as a slime flux, from the koa tree (Acacia koa).

== Conservation ==
Drosophila musaphilia was listed as federally endangered in 2006 along with ten other species of picture-wing Drosophila. Threats to the conservation of D. musaphilia include loss-of-habitat, in part due to invasive pigs, goats, and invasive plant species, such as strawberry guava (Psidium cattleyanum). In addition, breeding habitat (Acacia koa) is threatened by browsing from non-native black-tailed deer.

Invasive plants such as Psidium cattleianum, Lantana camara, Melinis minutiflora, and Rubus argutus threaten the conservation of D. musaphilia and other members of the native Hawaiian ecosystem. These plants can overwhelm native species and outcompete them for access to light. In addition, flammable grass species such as Melinis minutiflora contribute to rapidly spreading forest fires. These threats are especially relevant to the conservation of D. musaphilia, as the breeding substrate for this species is thought to be inherently rare.
