= Spelaeorchestia =

Spelaeorchestia koloana

Conservation status
- Endangered (IUCN 2.3)

- Endangered (ESA)

Scientific classification
- Kingdom: Animalia
- Phylum: Arthropoda
- Class: Malacostraca
- Order: Amphipoda
- Family: Talitridae
- Genus: Spelaeorchestia
- Species: S. koloana

Binomial name
- Spelaeorchestia koloana Bousfield & Howarth, 1976

Genus of crustaceans

Spelaeorchestia koloana, the Kauaʻi cave amphipod or ʻuku noho ana in Hawaiian, is a cave-dwelling crustacean only found on the Hawaiian island of Kauaʻi. It is eyeless and measures 7–10 mm (0.28–0.39 in) long. It is only known from 10 populations, and eats decaying plant matter and other decomposing material.

The Kauaʻi cave amphipod is endemic to the caves on Kauaʻi, Hawaii. Its main predator is the Kauaʻi cave wolf spider Adelocosa anops, another endemic of the Kauaʻi cave. It is listed as an endangered species under the Endangered Species Act, and on the IUCN Red List.
