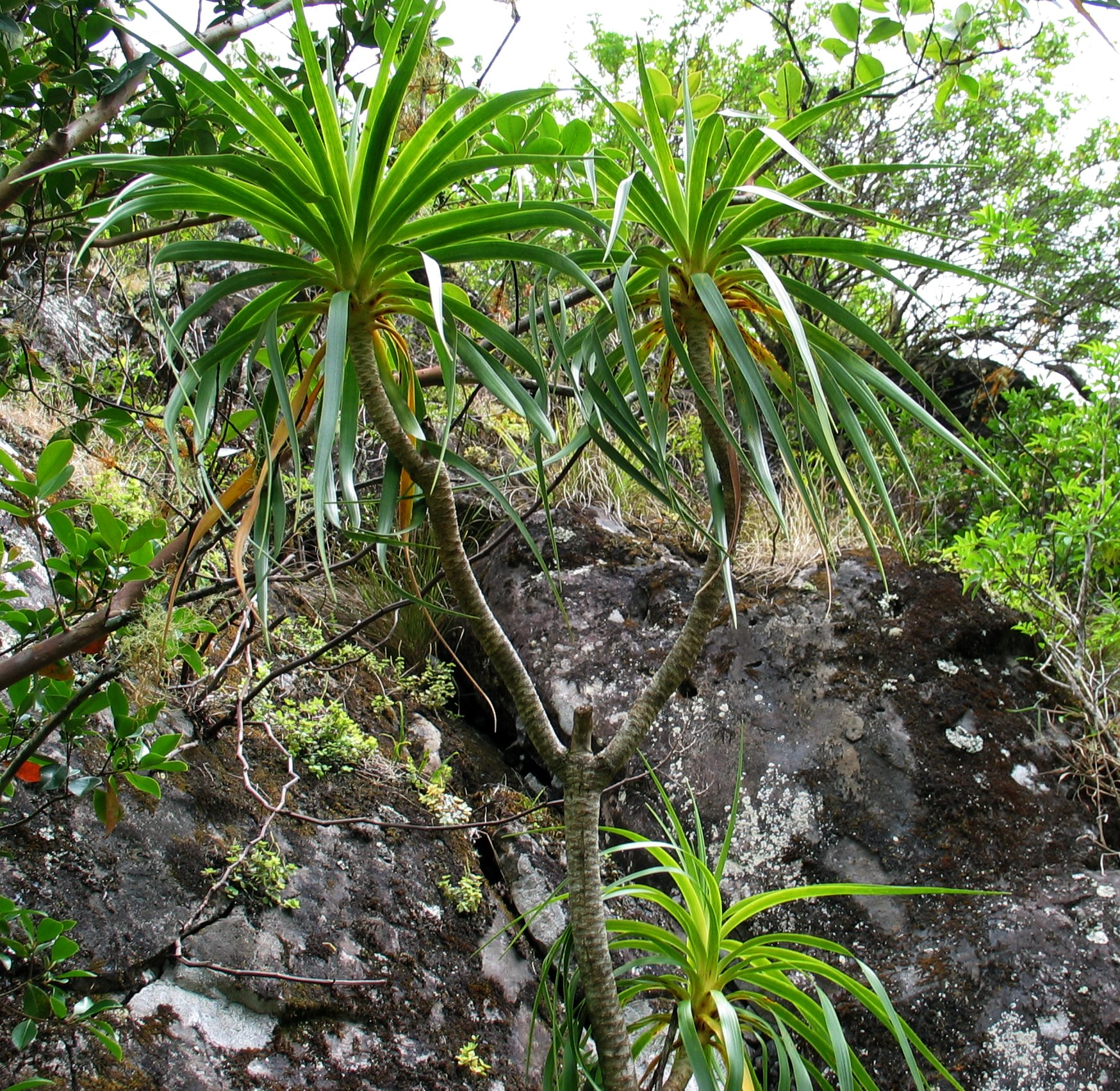

Conservation status
- Endangered (IUCN 2.3)

- Critically Imperiled (NatureServe)

Scientific classification
- Kingdom: Plantae
- Clade: Tracheophytes
- Clade: Angiosperms
- Clade: Monocots
- Order: Asparagales
- Family: Asparagaceae
- Subfamily: Convallarioideae
- Genus: Dracaena
- Species: D. forbesii

Binomial name
- Dracaena forbesii (O.Deg.) Jankalski

Synonyms
- Chrysodracon forbesii (O.Deg.) P.L.Lu & Morden; Pleomele forbesii O.Deg.

= Dracaena forbesii =

Species of tree

Dracaena forbesii, synonym Pleomele forbesii, (Waianae Range hala pepe or Forbes' dracaena) is a species of flowering plant that is endemic to the island of Oʻahu in Hawaiʻi. It inhabits dry, coastal mesic and mixed mesic forests at elevations of 240–730 metres (790–2,400 ft). It is threatened by habitat loss.
