= Drosophila differens =

Conservation status
- Critically Imperiled (NatureServe)

- Endangered (ESA)

Scientific classification
- Kingdom: Animalia
- Phylum: Arthropoda
- Clade: Pancrustacea
- Class: Insecta
- Order: Diptera
- Family: Drosophilidae
- Genus: Drosophila
- Species: D. differens

Binomial name
- Drosophila differens (Hardy and Kaneshiro, 1975)

Endangered Hawaiian fly

Drosophila differens is an endangered species of Hawaiian fly in the family Drosophilidae. This species is a member of the planitiba subgroup of the picture-wing clade of Hawaiian Drosophila. It is found on the island of Molokai.

== Description ==
Drosophila differens was described by D. Elmo Hardy and Kenneth Y. Kaneshiro in 1975. This fly is very similar to its Maui relative, D. planitibia, though most individuals of D. differens has a yellow face while D. planitibia have a black face. However, Hardy and Kaneshiro report that it is difficult to find any consistently distinguishing character. These two species are capable of hybridizing, but crosses in both directions produce sterile males.

D. differens is larger than many other picture-wing species. It is reported to breed in the rotting bark of Clermontia species.

== Conservation ==
Drosophila hemipeza was listed as federally endangered in 2006 along with ten other species of picture-wing Drosophila. Threats to the conservation of D. hemipeza include loss-of-habitat, in part due to invasive pigs and rats, as well as introduced predators such as yellowjacket wasps. Invasive plants such as Psidium cattleianum also threaten the conservation of D. differens by overwhelming native species and outcompete them for access to light. On Molokai, non-native axis deer threaten native ecosystems by trampling and overgrazing native plants.
