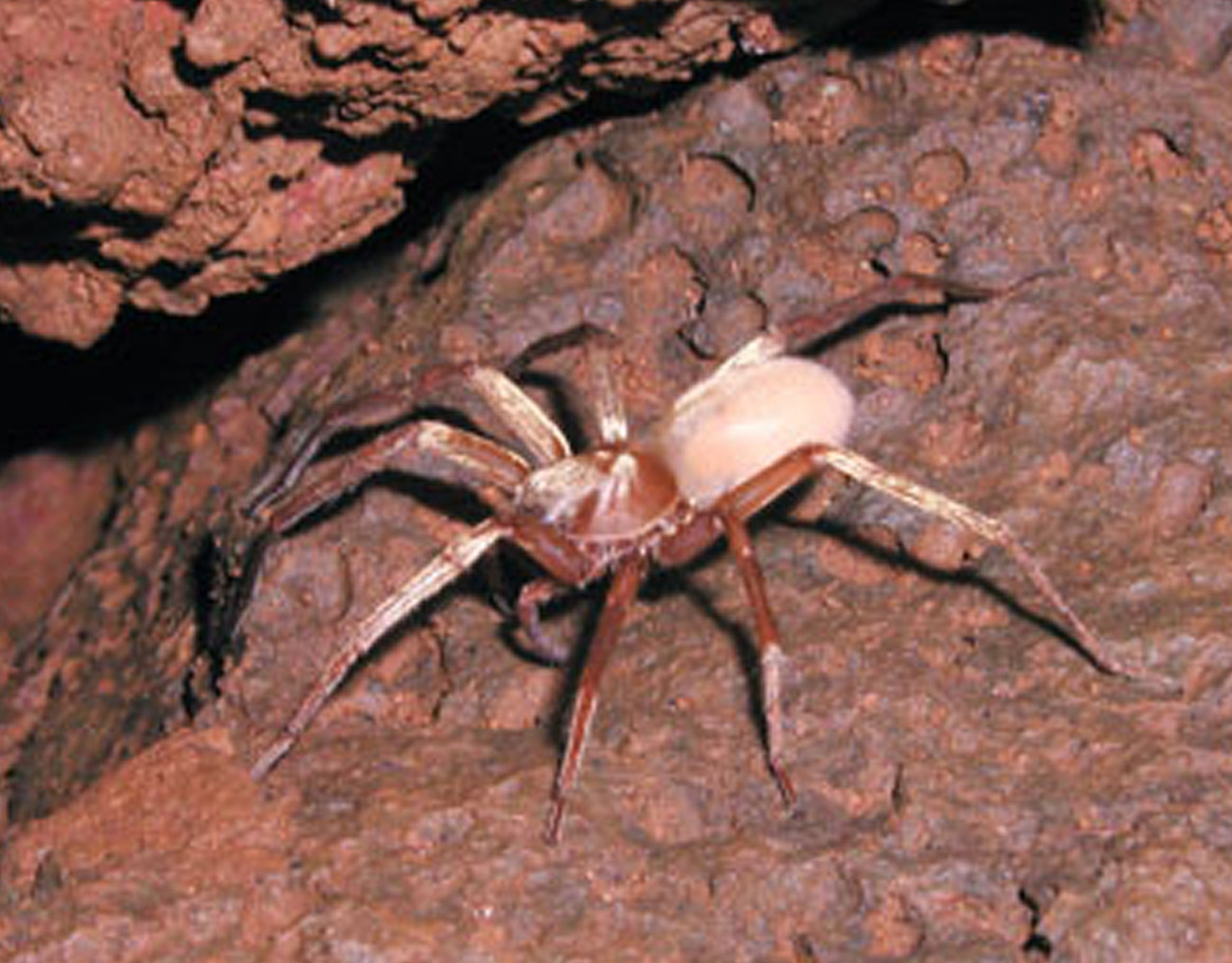

Conservation status
- Endangered (IUCN 2.3)

- Critically Imperiled (NatureServe)

Scientific classification
- Kingdom: Animalia
- Phylum: Arthropoda
- Subphylum: Chelicerata
- Class: Arachnida
- Order: Araneae
- Infraorder: Araneomorphae
- Family: Lycosidae
- Genus: Adelocosa; Gertsch, 1973
- Species: A. anops

Binomial name
- Adelocosa anops Gertsch, 1973
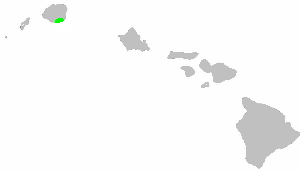

= Kauaʻi cave wolf spider =

Species of spider

The Kauaʻi cave wolf spider (Adelocosa anops), also known to local residents as the blind spider, is a species of wolf spider. It is monotypic within the genus Adelocosa.

The Kauaʻi cave wolf spider is only known to occur in a few caves in a lava flow with an area of 10.5 km^{2} (4.1 sq mi) in the Kōloa–Poʻipū region of Kauaʻi, Hawaiian Islands, and only six populations are known to exist. While their nearest surface-dwelling relatives have large eyes, this species has completely lost its eyes. They reach a body length around 20 mm (0.8 in) and are reddish brown and completely harmless to people. Unlike most wolf spiders, it produces only 15 to 30 eggs per clutch. The female carries the egg sac in her mouthparts until the spiderlings hatch.

One of its primary prey species is the Kauaʻi cave amphipod, Spelaeorchestia koloana, which is only known from nine populations and reaches about 10 mm (0.4 in) in length. These feed on decomposing plant matter. The Kauaʻi cave wolf spider was discovered in 1973. Counts have never documented more than 30 spiders or 80 amphipods.

== Description ==
Adult Kauaʻi cave wolf spiders typically measure between 12.7 and 19.0 millimeters (0.5-0.75 inches) in length. The Kauaʻi cave wolf spider is the only wolf spider to completely lack eyes. It has a reddish brown to orange carapace with a pale abdomen and bright orange legs. Each leg has four pairs of short black spines and a thin coating of pale, silky hairs. The chelicera has three large teeth used for biting prey.

== Life history ==
Kauaʻi cave wolf spiders have a small clutch size compared to other wolf spiders. Kauaʻi cave wolf spiders only produce 15–30 eggs per clutch, whereas other terrestrial wolf spiders may have 100 to 300. Female Kauaʻi cave wolf spiders carry their egg sacs on their backs until their spiderlings hatch in 30 to 50 days. Upon hatching, the large spiderlings are carried on the back of the mother for several days. Kauaʻi cave wolf spiders have an adapted row of comb-like teeth on their claws. These align with the branched hairs of their mother's back and allow the spiderlings to hold onto the mother securely for protection and transport. This species takes up to a year to reach sexual maturity. At that time, the spiderlings are old enough to hunt for themselves and disperse from the mother.

Little is known about the mating strategies of Kauaʻi cave wolf spiders.

Ecologists hypothesize that the Kauaʻi cave wolf spider's life history has been shaped by a behavior that allows other wolf spiders to fly through the air at short and long distances. Aerial dispersal is a behavior employed most often by young spiderlings, or instars, though it has never been observed in Kauaʻi cave wolf spiders. However, there are close relatives of this species that are able to disperse aerially and that inhabit the islands next to Kauaʻi. This suggests that Kauaʻi cave wolf spiders originated from an ancestor that came from other nearby Hawaiian islands. Dispersal mechanisms and behaviors allow individuals in a population to avoid competition for resources, unfavorable environmental conditions, and predation. Utilizing aerial dispersal would be dependent on the trade-off between the costs of landing in an unstable environment and the benefits of finding a new environment with fewer constraints or threats.

== Ecology ==
=== Diet ===
The Kauaʻi cave wolf spider is an opportunistic feeder, meaning it feeds on other cave inhabitants whenever possible. Its diet may include the Kaua'i cave amphipod, as well as introduced spiders and cockroaches.

=== Behavior ===
The Kauaʻi cave wolf spider is slow-moving and spends most of its time standing still. Instead of building a web, the Kauaʻi cave wolf spider waits on the ground for prey. It senses prey through vibrations and chemical signals. Once it senses prey, the spider approaches and alternates raising its front legs vertically. Little information is available about the spider's mating behavior, but it is known that females carry the egg sac and care for the young.

=== Habitat ===
The Kauaʻi cave wolf spider is an obligate cave-dweller. It lives in large cave passages, small mesocaverns, and cracks that are inaccessible to humans. Since they can die of desiccation in low humidity, the Kauaʻi cave wolf spider requires a high humidity habitat. Because of this, they prefer to inhabit the dark and stagnant air zones of caves. These zones are characterized by high humidity, low air movement, and low temperature fluctuations.

=== Range ===
The Kauaʻi cave wolf spider is only found in the Koloa Basin of the Hawaiian island of Kauaʻi. Within the island, Kauaʻi cave wolf spiders are only found in three caves regularly. These are called Koloa Cave 1, Koloa Cave 2, and Kiahuna Mauka Cave. Kauaʻi cave wolf spiders are also found in one experimental cave operated by the US Fish and Wildlife Service, called Cave 3075C.

== Conservation ==
The Kauaʻi cave wolf spider was first listed as endangered under the Endangered Species Act in 2000, after being proposed to be listed in 1997. Three 5-year reviews have been filed mentioning the Kauaʻi cave wolf spider in 2005, 2015, and 2020 which have considered the spider to still be endangered.

=== Threats ===
The Kauaʻi cave wolf spider is threatened by habitat modification, novel competition, and chemical runoff. Habitat modification is largely due to human development and interaction. Construction projects can expose caves to surface air and desiccate the subterranean environment. This also allows novel species like the introduced brown violin spider to enter, which is known to outcompete with the native Kauaʻi cave wolf spider for prey. Development of agriculture and recreational areas, for example, golf courses, changes the surface vegetation composition above cave environments. This vegetation's shallow root composition decreases input of detritus into cave systems and increases sediment deposition. Recreational exploration of caves by humans also negatively impacts the delicate ecosystem of the cave as well.

=== Recovery ===
A recovery plan published in 2006 stated that the Kauaʻi cave wolf spider would be delisted as endangered when 12 populations of the spider are observed to have the following conditions: stable, self-sustaining, protected from human interference, and their habitat being utilized in a manner conducive to conservation.

Recovery actions to meet this goal include protecting known populations from human-induced degradation, enhancing habitats known previously to have populations, conducting research to identify species-specific conservation strategies, educating the public on conservation efforts, and validating current conservation practices.

== See also ==
- List of troglobites
