= Drosophila neoclavisetae =

Conservation status
- Endangered (ESA)

Scientific classification
- Domain: Eukaryota
- Kingdom: Animalia
- Phylum: Arthropoda
- Class: Insecta
- Order: Diptera
- Family: Drosophilidae
- Genus: Drosophila
- Species: D. neoclavisetae

Binomial name
- Drosophila neoclavisetae (Perreira and Kaneshiro, 1990)

Endangered Hawaiian fly

Drosophila neoclavisetae is an endangered species of fly from Hawaii, in the species rich lineage of Hawaiian Drosophilidae. It is only found in West Maui. It can be distinguished from its East Maui counterpart, D. clavisetae, by the shape of the long hairs on the abdomen, which are more rounded in D. neoclavisetae and more flattened in D. clavisetae.

== Description ==
Drosophila neoclavisetae was described in 1990 by William D. Perreira and Kenneth Y. Kaneshiro, from specimens collected in Pu'u Kukui, in West Maui. This species is a member of the adiastola subgroup in the picture-winged clade. Male and female flies are predominantly brown, with a stripe on the thorax, and wing spots similar to other species in the adiastola group. D. neoclavistae flies have an extra cross vein in cell R5 of the wing, a feature they share with D. neogrimshawi and D. clavisetae in the same species complex.

The breeding substrate of D. neoclavistae is unknown, but thought to be a species of Cyanea based on where it has been collected and the breeding habits of closely related species.

Both D. neoclavisetae and D. clavisetae perform a mating dance where the male raises its abdomen over its head and produces a droplet of liquid from the anal gland, which it then vibrates in the direction of a female. The droplet is thought to contain a sex pheromone

== Conservation ==
Drosophila neoclavisetae was listed as federally endangered in 2006 along with ten other species of picture-wing Drosophila. Threats to the conservation of D. tarphytrichia include loss-of-habitat, in part due to invasive pigs and rats.
