= Drosophila sharpi =

Conservation status
- Critically Imperiled (NatureServe)

Scientific classification
- Kingdom: Animalia
- Phylum: Arthropoda
- Clade: Pancrustacea
- Class: Insecta
- Order: Diptera
- Family: Drosophilidae
- Genus: Drosophila
- Subgenus: Drosophila
- Species: D. sharpi

Binomial name
- Drosophila sharpi Grimshaw, 1901

Synonyms
- Drosophila attigua

Species of fly

Drosophila sharpi (syn. D. attigua) is a rare species of fly, one of several species known as the Hawaiian picture-wing flies. It is endemic to Hawaii, where it is known only from the island of Kauai. It was federally listed as an endangered species of the United States in 2010.

This fly lives in wet forest habitat between about 3000 and 4000 feet in elevation on the island of Kauai. It is a microbivore that lives on decomposing plant material, likely from Cheirodendron and Tetraplasandra.
