= Drosophila lanaiensis =

Conservation status
- Extinct (IUCN 2.3)

Scientific classification
- Kingdom: Animalia
- Phylum: Arthropoda
- Class: Insecta
- Order: Diptera
- Family: Drosophilidae
- Genus: Drosophila
- Species: †D. lanaiensis

Binomial name
- †Drosophila lanaiensis Grimshaw, 1901

Species of fly

Drosophila lanaiensis is an extinct species of fly in family Drosophilidae that was endemic to Hawaii. It lived on Lānaʻi, and possibly on Oʻahu.
