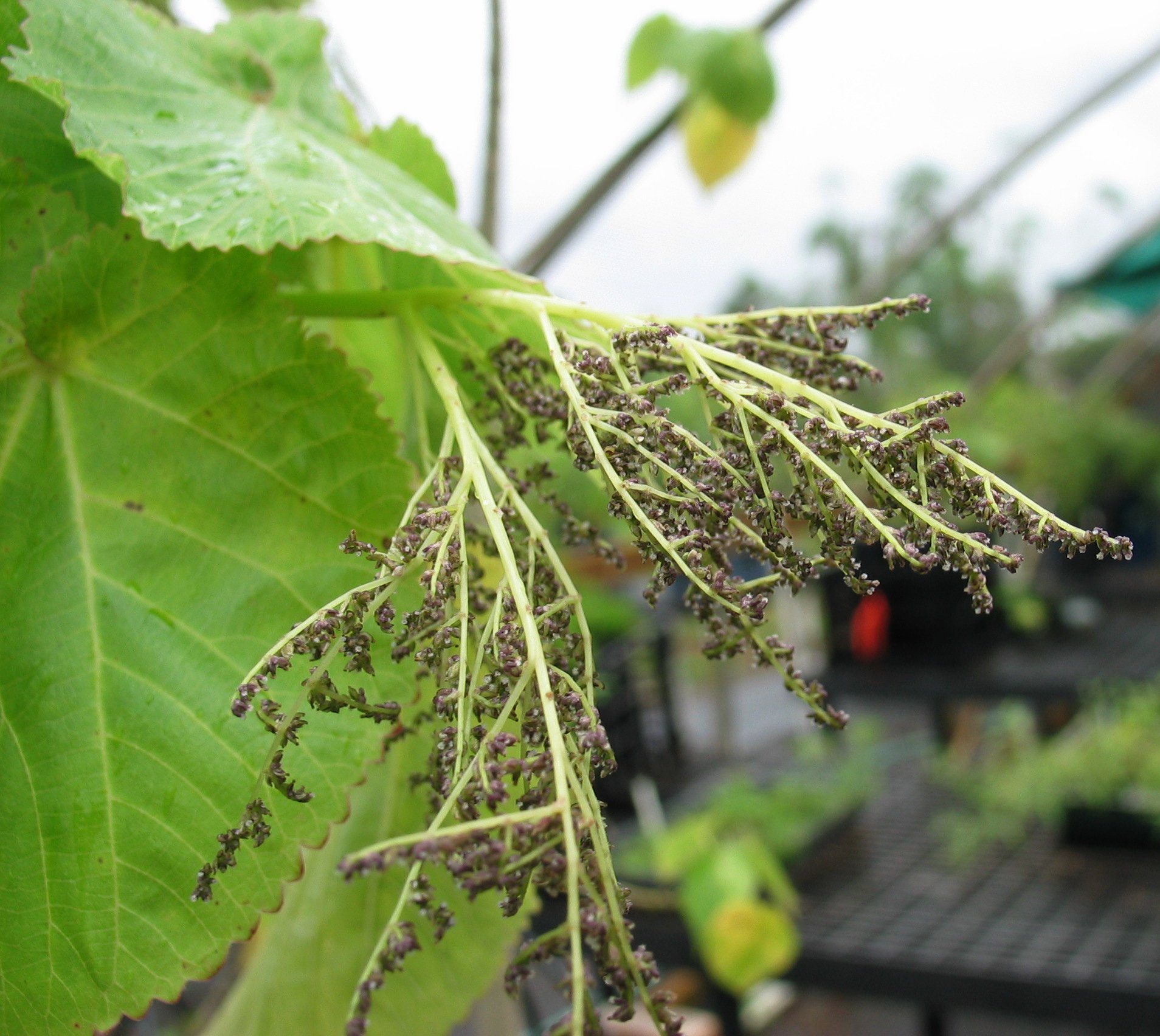

Conservation status
- Critically Endangered (IUCN 2.3)

- Endangered (ESA)

Scientific classification
- Kingdom: Plantae
- Clade: Tracheophytes
- Clade: Angiosperms
- Clade: Eudicots
- Clade: Rosids
- Order: Rosales
- Family: Urticaceae
- Genus: Urera
- Species: U. kaalae

Binomial name
- Urera kaalae Wawra

= Urera kaalae =

Species of flowering plant

Urera kaalae, commonly known as opuhe, is a species of flowering plant in the nettle family, Urticaceae, that is endemic to the island of Oʻahu in Hawaii. It inhabits slopes and gulches in mesic forests at elevations of 300–760 m (980–2,490 ft). Currently it is restricted to the southern and central parts of the Waiʻanae Mountains. Associated plants include maile (Alyxia oliviformis), hame (Antidesma platyphyllum), Asplenium kaulfusii, Athyrium spp., ʻāwikiwiki (Canavalia spp.), pāpala (Charpentiera spp.), ʻakoko (Euphorbia spp.), poʻolā (Claoxylon sandwicense), ēlama (Diospyros hillebrandii), Doryopteris spp., ʻieʻi.e. (Freycinetia arborea), manono (Hedyotis acuminata), Hibiscus spp., olopua (Nestegis sandwicensis), māmaki (Pipturus albidus), hala pepe (Dracaena spp.), ʻālaʻa (Pouteria sandwicensis), kōpiko (Psychotria spp.), heuhiuhi (Senna gaudichaudii), aʻiaʻi (Paratrophis pendulina), ōpuhe (Touchardia sandwicensis), and maua (Xylosma hawaiensis). It is threatened by habitat loss.
