= Labellum (insect anatomy) =

Head morphology of Muscid fly.: 1. labellum, showing pseudotracheae; 2. labium, 3. maxillary palp, 4. labrum; 5. subgenal area; 6. clypeus; 7. fronto-orbital area; 8. fronto-orbital bristles; 9. outer vertical bristle; 10. inner vertical bristle; 11. postocellar bristles; 12. ocelli; 13. ocellar bristles; 14. compound eye; 15. Frontal or ptilinal suture; 16. antenna; 17. arista; 18. vibrissa.

In entomology, the term labellum has been applied variously and in partly contradictory ways. One usage is in referring to a elongation of the labrum that covers the base of the rostrum in certain Coleoptera and Hemiptera.

In contrast, the most common current use of the term is in the anatomy of the mouthparts of Diptera, particularly those in which the labium forms the bulk of the proboscis, such as in the housefly family. Typically, the labium is expanded distally into a pair of fleshy labella. In the early twentieth century it was argued that the labella are the modified labial palps, and that point of view still is seen as having merit. In flies such as the mosquitoes, that have long antennae, the labella are two separate organs, attached to the proboscis only at their bases, but in the flies with short antennae, such as the house fly, they are more or less fused to form a single structure. Flies with fused labella have food channels in the surface of the labella. These are called pseudotracheae. They form the "spongy" part of a housefly's "tongue".

== See also ==
- Arthropod mouthparts
