= Hampton L. Carson (biologist) =

American geneticist

- Born: November 5, 1914; Philadelphia, Pennsylvania
- Died: December 19, 2004 (aged 90); Hawaii
- Education: University of Pennsylvania (BA, 1936; PhD, 1943).
- Known for: Work on the chromosomes of new species of the fruit fly Drosophila
- Spouse: Meredith
- Awards: Leidy Award from the Academy of Natural Sciences of Philadelphia (1985)
- Scientific career
- Fields: Genetics
- Institutions: Washington University in St. Louis (1943–1971); University of Hawaiʻi at Mānoa (1971–1985)

Hampton Lawrence Carson (November 5, 1914 – December 19, 2004) was an American biologist best known for his work on the chromosomes of new species of the fruit fly Drosophila and his contributions to our understanding of their evolution.

Carson was born in Philadelphia, Pennsylvania and studied zoology there at the University of Pennsylvania, receiving his A.B. degree in 1936 and his Ph.D. degree in 1943. His doctoral thesis on the cytogenetics of dark-winged fungus gnats was considered "definitive" by Dobzhansky.

Carson spent virtually all of his career at two universities — Washington University in St. Louis (1943–1971) and University of Hawaiʻi at Mānoa (1971–1985) — except for sabbatical leaves to Brazil and Australia.

Carson studied the population genetics and polytene chromosome polymorphisms of the highly diverse lineage of Drosophila species on the Hawaiian islands and proposed that speciation of these flies in the island chain was tied to isolation caused by formation of new islands. New species were slightly different from those in the nearest island, and progressively more different from those in more distant islands. Within islands, he argued that isolation between some species was caused by lava flows creating different forest patches or kipukas, and that reproductive isolation was accelerated due to within deme sexual selection.

He was awarded the 1985 Leidy Award from the Academy of Natural Sciences of Philadelphia. Although Hampton Carson retired from the University of Hawaii faculty in 1985, he remained active in research and continued living in Hawaii with his wife and colleague Meredith. He died in Hawaii.
