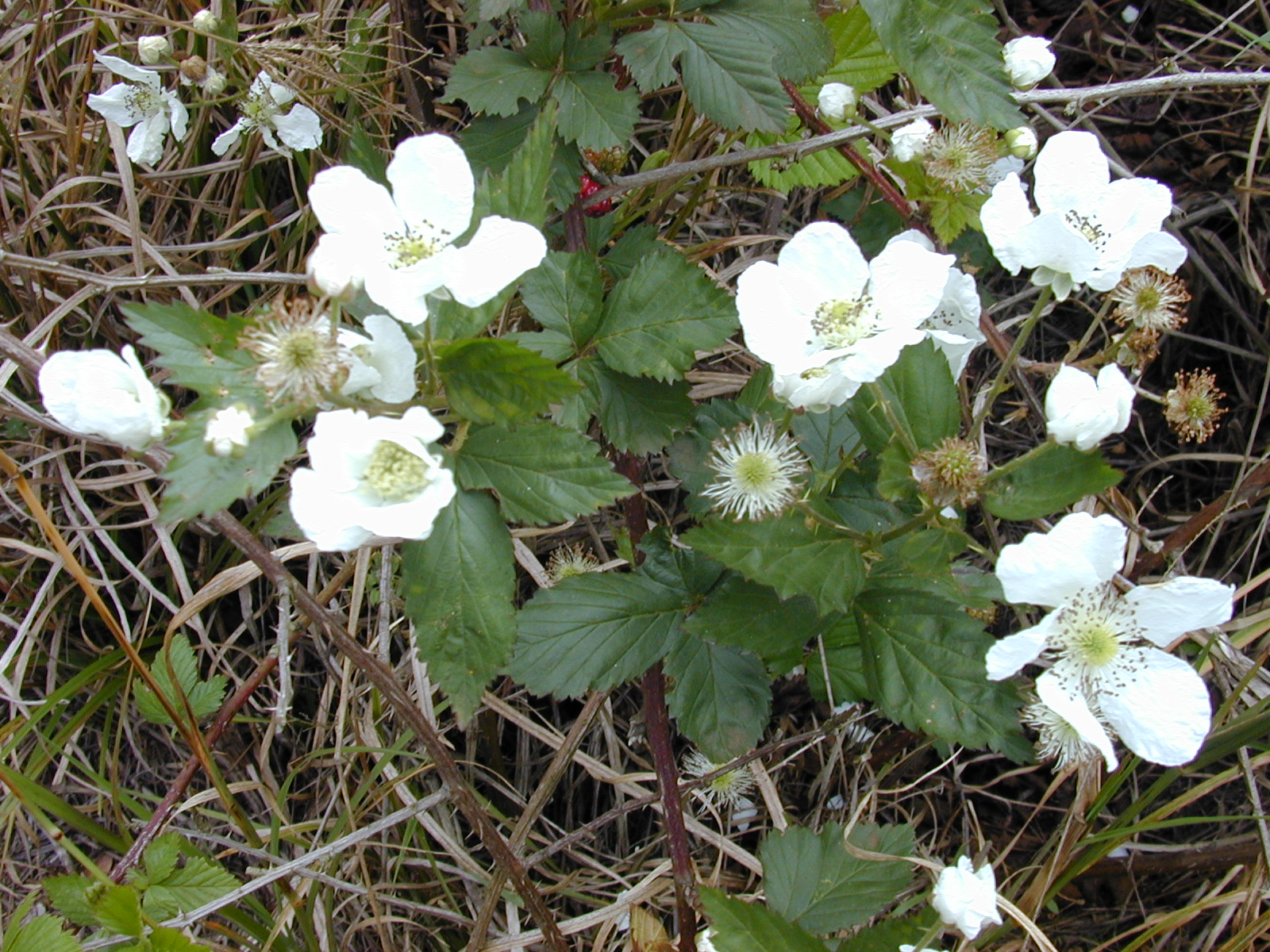

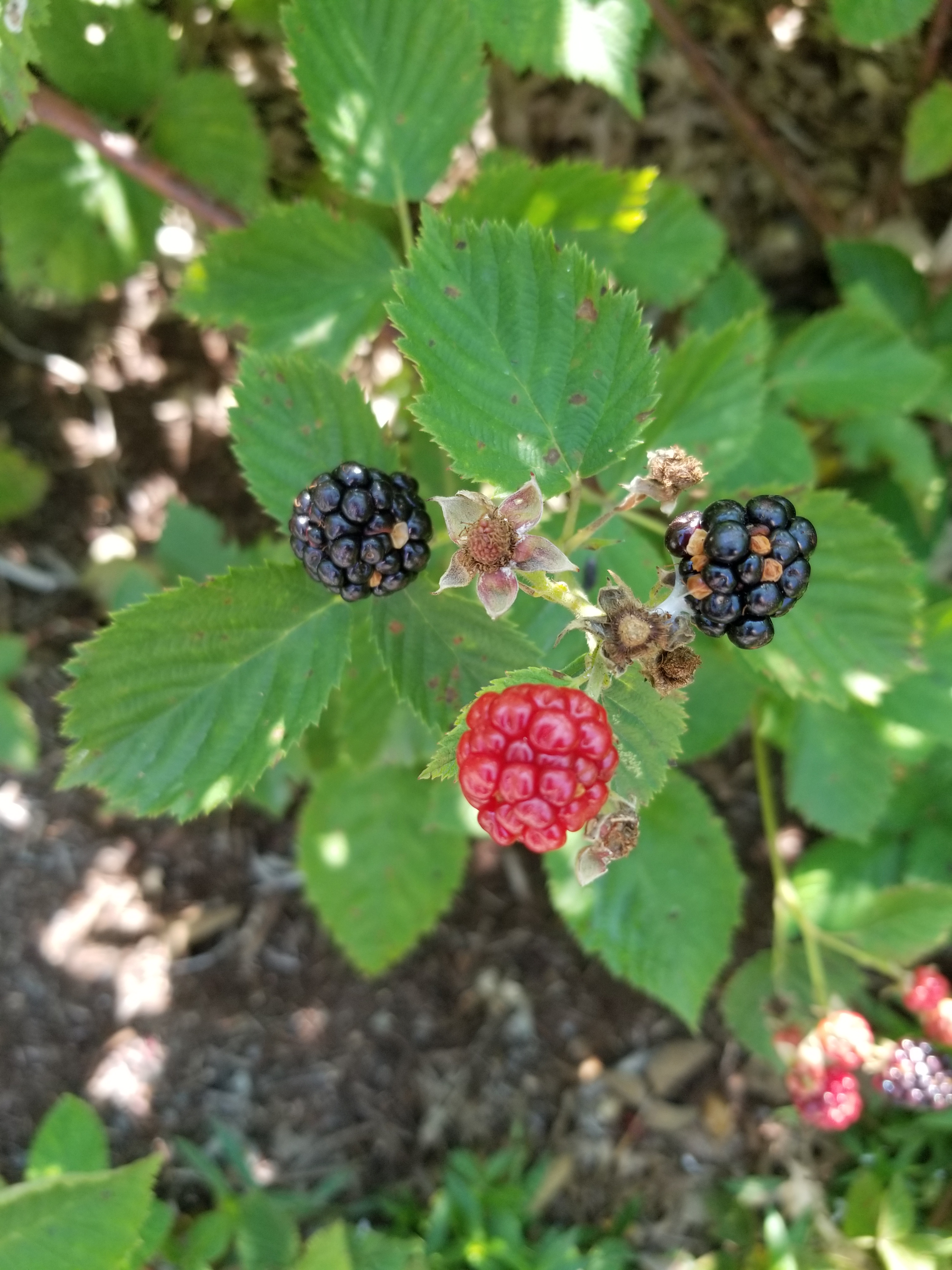

Conservation status
- Secure (NatureServe)

Scientific classification
- Kingdom: Plantae
- Clade: Embryophytes
- Clade: Tracheophytes
- Clade: Spermatophytes
- Clade: Angiosperms
- Clade: Eudicots
- Clade: Rosids
- Order: Rosales
- Family: Rosaceae
- Genus: Rubus
- Subgenus: Rubus subg. Rubus
- Species: R. argutus

Binomial name
- Rubus argutus Link. 1822

Synonyms
- Synonymy: Rubus abundiflorus L.H.Bailey; Rubus betulifolius Small; Rubus floridensis L.H.Bailey; Rubus floridus Tratt.; Rubus incisifrons L.H.Bailey; Rubus louisianus A.Berger; Rubus penetrans L.H.Bailey; Rubus rhodophyllus Rydb.

= Rubus argutus =

Species of fruit and plant

Rubus argutus is a North American species of prickly bramble in the rose family. It is a perennial plant native to the eastern and south-central United States. Common names are sawtooth blackberry or tall blackberry after its high growth.

== Description ==
R. argutus usually forms woody shrubs or vines, up to 2 metres (6 1/2 ft) tall, with thorns on stems, leaves, and flowers. The leaves are alternate and palmately compound. First-year plants have palmate leaves with 5 leaflets while second-year plants have palmate leaves with 3 leaflets.

Second-year plants develop racemes of flowers each containing 5–20 flowers. The flowers are typically 5‑merous with large, white petals and light green sepals, borne in mid-spring. Second-year plants are also capable of growing the fruit which gives the plant's common name, the blackberry. The fruits are compound drupes which change from bright red to black at maturity. Each section (drupelet) of a blackberry contains a single seed. Second-year plants die after bearing fruits, but regrow from the underground portion of the plant.

== Distribution and habitat ==
The species grows from Florida to Texas, Missouri, Illinois, and Maine.

== Uses ==
The species is one of many that produces edible blackberries, which differ by size.

Blackberry leaves were in the official U.S. pharmacopoeia for a time and were said to treat digestive problems, particularly diarrhea. Their dried leaves make an excellent tea.
