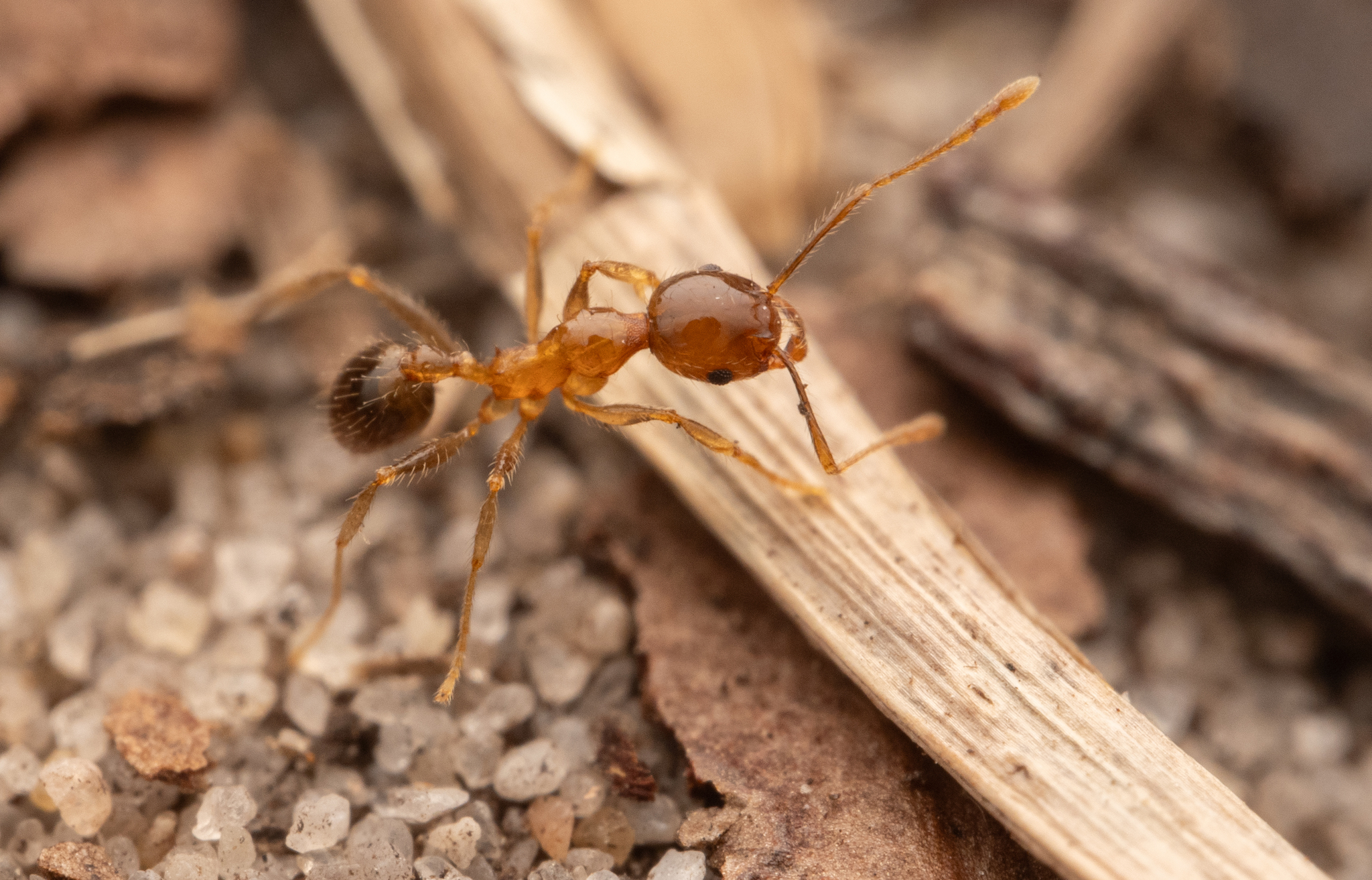
- African Big-headed Ant (Pheidole megacephala)

Scientific classification
- Kingdom: Animalia
- Phylum: Arthropoda
- Clade: Pancrustacea
- Class: Insecta
- Order: Hymenoptera
- Family: Formicidae
- Subfamily: Myrmicinae
- Genus: Pheidole
- Species: P. megacephala

Binomial name
- Pheidole megacephala (Fabricius, 1793)

Synonyms
- Formica megacephala Fabricius, 1793; Atta testacea Smith 1858; Formica edax Forskal 1775; Myrmica laevigata F. Smith; Myrmica suspiciosa Smith 1859; Myrmica trinodis Losana 1834; Oecophthora perniciosa Gerstacker 1859; Oecophthora pusilla Heer 1852; Pheidole janus F. Smith; Pheidole laevigata Mayr

= Pheidole megacephala =

Species of ant

Pheidole megacephala is a species of ant in the subfamily Myrmicinae. It is commonly known as the big-headed ant in the US and the coastal brown ant in Australia. It is a very successful invasive species and is considered a danger to native ants in Australia and other places. It is regarded as one of the world's worst invasive ant species.

== Distribution ==
Pheidole megacephala was described from a specimen from the island of Mauritius by the entomologist Johan Christian Fabricius in 1793, although a 1775 record exists for Egypt, under the name Formica edax. Regardless of its African origin, big-headed ants have since spread to many tropical and subtropical parts of the world.

== Description ==
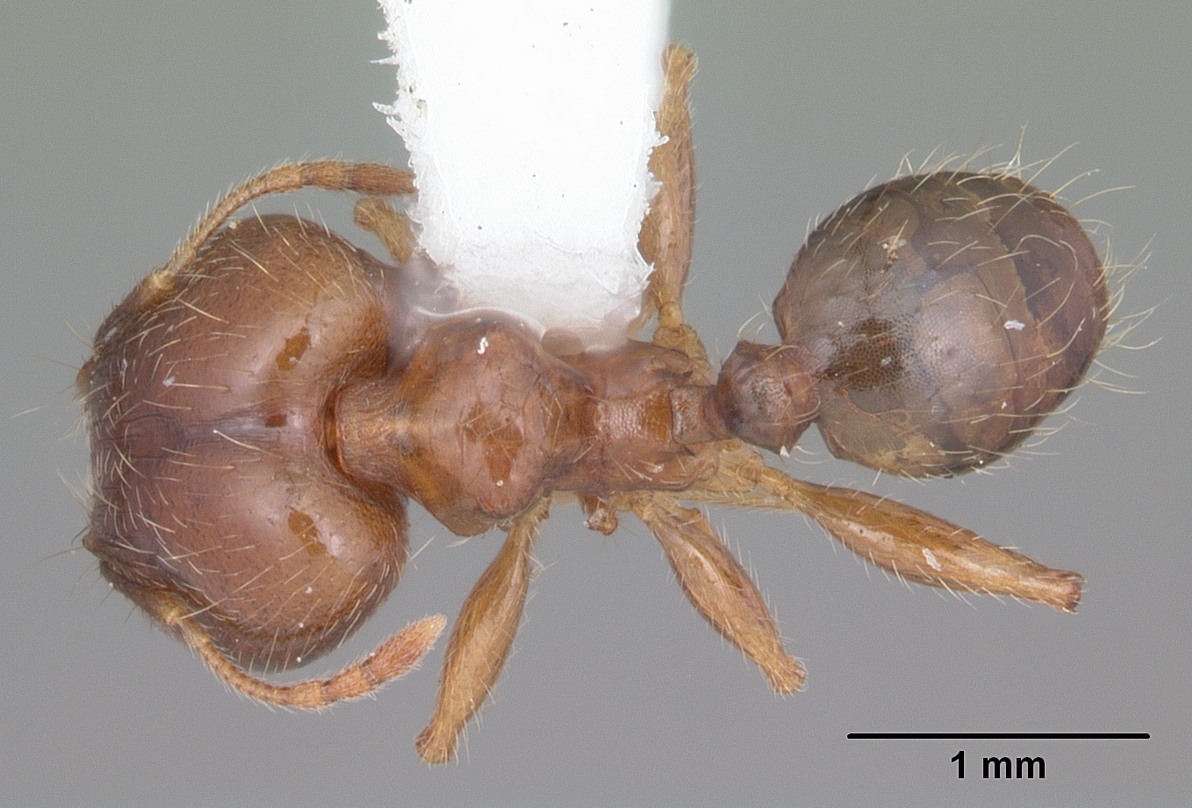
A dorsal view of a major worker bigheaded ant

There are two castes (types) of worker ants, the major worker and the minor worker. The common name of bigheaded ant derives from the major worker's disproportionately large head. Major workers are not primarily involved in defence like soldiers of other ant species. They have thick and powerful mandibles which they use to crush seeds and cut up other larger pieces of food for the smaller and more numerous minor workers to transport back to the nest. The major workers are about four millimetres in length, twice as long as the minor workers. The colour of both types varies from yellowish-brown or reddish-brown to nearly black.

The rear half of the head is smooth and glossy, and the front half sculptured. The twelve-segmented antennae are curved and have club-like tips. The waist or petiole is two-segmented with the node immediately behind conspicuously swollen. There are a pair of short, upward-facing spines on the waist. The body has sparse, long hairs.

== Colonies and reproduction ==
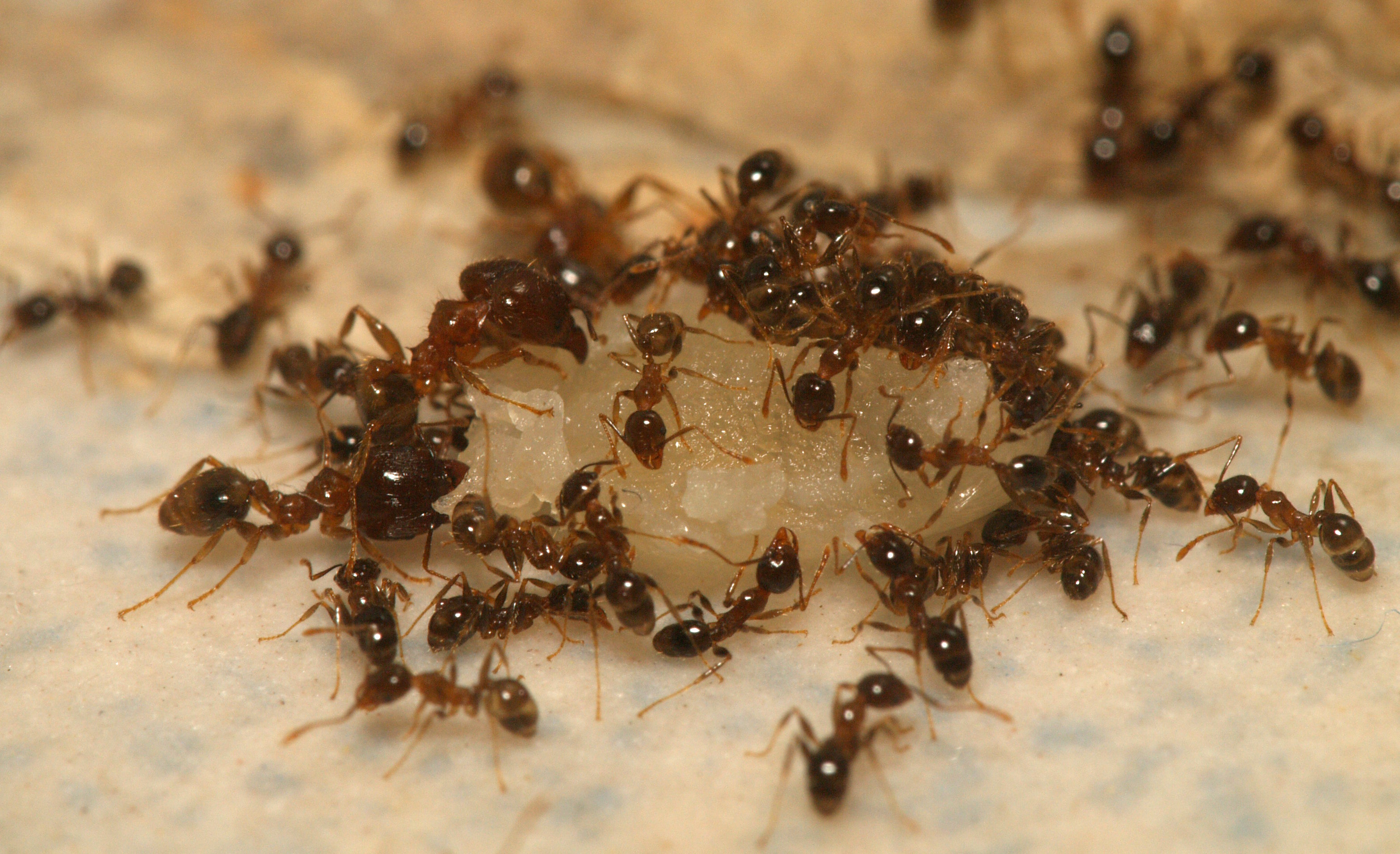
Minor and major workers feeding on a crumb, indoors

Bigheaded ants nest in colonies underground. Colonies can have several queens. Supercolonies can be formed by budding, when a queen and workers leave the original nest and set up a new colony nearby without swarming. In Florida, nuptial flights of winged ants take place during the winter and spring and afterwards. Fertilized queens shed their wings and find a suitable site to found a new colony where they start laying eggs.

Each queen lays up to 290 eggs per month. The eggs hatch after two to four weeks. The legless white larvae, which are fed by the workers, pupate about a month later. The adult workers emerge ten to twenty days after that.

The minor workers are much more numerous than the soldiers. Trails of ants lead up trunks, along branches and into the canopies of trees and debris-covered foraging tunnels. Numerous nest entrances are created on the surface of the ground. These may be confused with similar tubes built by subterranean termites.

Pheidole megacephala can also live indoors.

== Nutrition ==
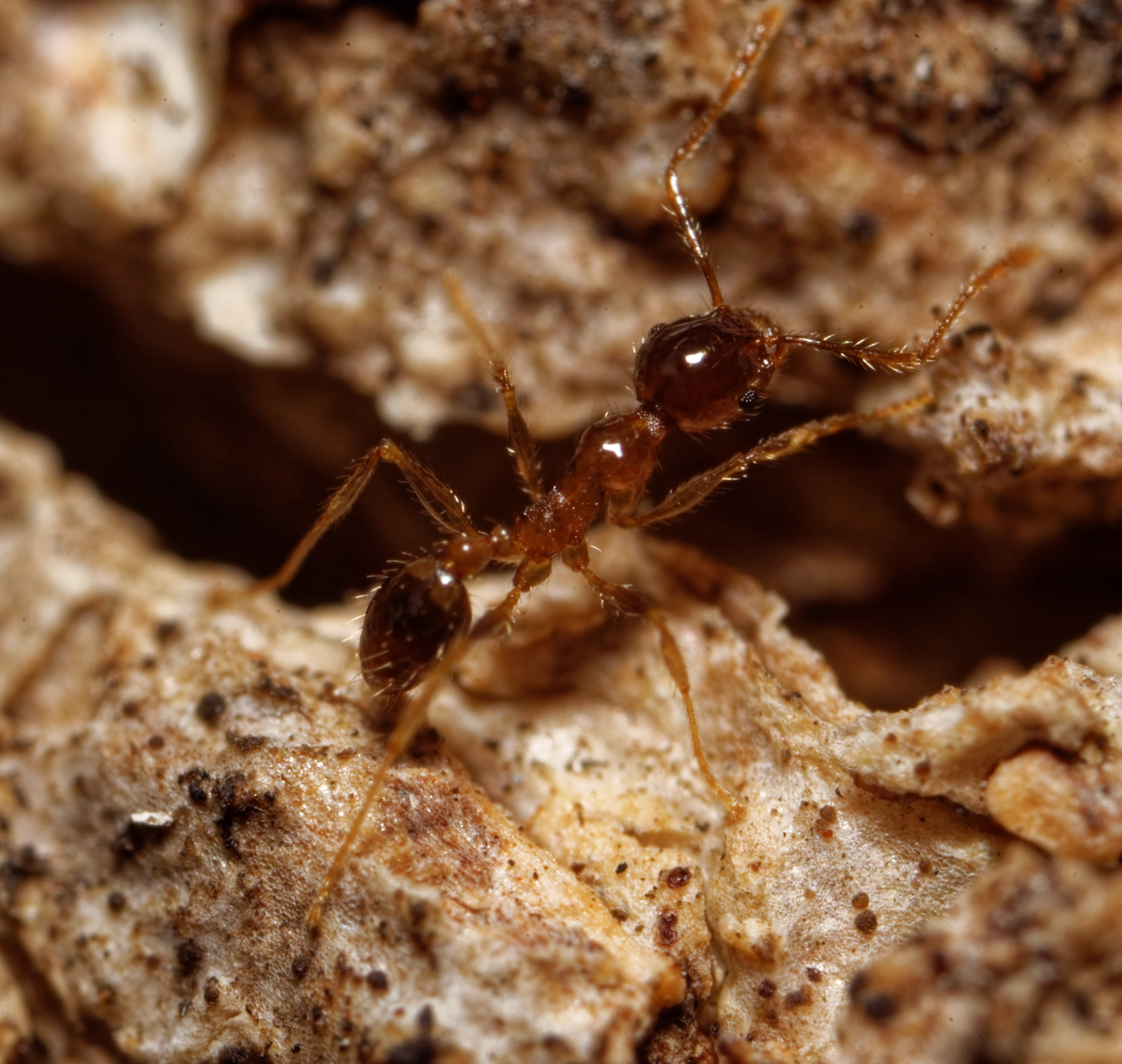
A minor worker climbing a tree

The bigheaded ants feed on dead insects, small invertebrates and honeydew excreted by insects such as aphids, soft scale insects, mealybugs, whiteflies and planthoppers. These sap-sucking bugs thrive in the presence of bigheaded ants, being more abundant on plants patrolled by ants than on those not so patrolled. Bigheaded ants are predators of the eggs of species of moths such as the African sugarcane borer, common in sub-Saharan Africa. Green scale, Coccus viridis, flourishes when bigheaded ants protected their food source, by removing predators such as lady beetle larvae and lepidopteran larvae.

Foraging ants will alert others to new food sources. Honeydew is ingested, but other foodstuffs are carried back to the nest by both major and minor workers, who may transfer items of food between themselves. Anything too big to be moved may be dissected before being brought back to the nest.

== Harmfulness ==
Bigheaded ants are a threat to biodiversity through the displacement of native invertebrate fauna and is a pest of agriculture through harvesting seeds and harbouring insects on crops. They are also known to chew on irrigation and telephone cabling as well as electrical wires. In a scientific study, Bigheaded ants are blamed for influencing the entire food chain in the Kenya savannah.
