= List of Drosophila species =

Drosophila is a genus of flies of the family Drosophilidae. It comprises over 1600 described species, but is estimated to have several thousands. Alfred Sturtevant divided Drosophila into a number of subgenera, including Drosophila, Sophophora, and Dorsilopha.

== A ==
- D. abjuncta - Hardy, 1965
- D. abregolineata - Duda, 1925
- D. abron - Burla, 1954
- D. abure - Burla, 1954
- D. acanthomera - Tsacas, 2001
- D. acanthoptera - Wheeler, 1949
- D. acanthos - Kam and Pereira in O'Grady et al., 2003
- D. acanthostoma - Hardy and Kaneshiro, 1968
- D. acelidota - Tsacas, 2004
- D. aceti - Kollar in Heeger, 1851
- D. achlya - Hardy, 1966
- D. acroria - Wheeler and Takada in Wheeler et al., 1962
- D. acrostichalis - Hardy, 1965
- D. acrostigma - Tsacas and Chassagnard, 1999
- D. acuminanus - Hunter, 1989
- D. acutilabella - Stalker, 1953
- D. adamisa - Chassagnard and Tsacas in Chassagnard et al., 1997
- D. adamsi - Wheeler, 1959
- D. addisoni - Pavan, 1950
- D. adiastola - Hardy, 1965
- D. adunca - Hardy, 1965
- D. adventitia - Hardy, 1965
- D. aenicta - Hardy, 1966
- D. afer - Tan, Hsu and Sheng, 1949
- D. affinidisjuncta - Hardy, 1978
- D. affinis - Sturtevant, 1916
- D. afoliolata - Zhang and Toda in Zhang, Toda and Watabe, 1995
- D. agitona - Hardy, 1965
- D. aglaia - Hardy, 1965
- D. aguape - Val and Marques, 1996
- D. agumbensis - Prakash and Reddy, 1978
- D. akai - Burla, 1954
- D. akoko - Magnacca and O'Grady, 2008
- D. alafumosa - Patterson and Mainland in Patterson, 1943
- D. alagitans - Patterson and Mainland in Patterson, 1943
- D. alani - Pipkin, 1964
- D. albescens - Frota-Pessoa, 1954
- D. albicans - Frota-Pessoa, 1954
- D. albifacies - Hardy, 1965
- D. albincisa - de Meijere, 1911
- D. albipalpis - Katoh, Toda and Gao, in Katoh et al., 2018
- D. albipes - Walker, 1852
- D. albirostris - Sturtevant, 1921
- D. albomarginata - Duda, 1927
- D. albomicans - (Duda, 1923)
- D. albonotata - de Meijere, 1911
- D. aldrichi - Patterson in Patterson and Crow, 1940
- D. alei - Brncic, 1962
- D. alexanderae - Pipkin, 1964
- D. alexandrei - Cordeiro, 1951
- D. alfari - Sturtevant, 1921
- D. algonquin - Sturtevant and Dobzhansky, 1936
- D. alladian - Burla, 1954
- D. allochroa - Tsacas, 2002
- D. aloma - Tsacas in Tsacas and Lachaise, 1981
- D. alpina - Burla, 1948
- D. alsophila - Hardy and Kaneshiro, 1971
- D. alternolineata - Duda, 1925
- D. altiplanica - Brncic and Koref-Santibanez, 1957
- D. altissima - Tsacas, 1980
- D. altukhovi - Imasheva, Lazebny, Cariou, David and Tsacas, 1994
- D. amaguana - Vela and Rafael, 2004
- D. ambigua - Pomini, 1940
- D. ambochila - Hardy and Kaneshiro, 1971
- D. americana - Spencer, 1938
- D. amita - Hardy, 1965
- D. amphibolos - Tsacas and Chassagnard, 1990
- D. amplipennis - Malloch, 1934
- D. amydrospilota - Hardy, 1965
- D. analis - Macquart, 1843
- D. analspina - Singh and Negi, 1995
- D. ananassae - Doleschall, 1858
- D. anapuu - Magnacca and O'Grady, 2009
- D. anceps - Patterson and Mainland, 1944
- D. ancora - Okada, 1968
- D. ancyla - Hardy, 1965
- D. andamanensis - Gupta and Ray-Chaudhuri, 1970
- D. andamanensis - Parshad and Singh, 1971
- D. angor - Lin and Ting, 1971
- D. angularis - Okada, 1956
- D. angustibucca - Duda, 1925
- D. anisoctena - Tsacas, 1980
- D. annularis - Sturtevant, 1916
- D. annulimana - Duda, 1927
- D. annulipes - Duda, 1924
- D. annulosa - Vilela and Bächli, 1990
- D. anomalata - McEvey and Schiffer, 2015
- D. anomalipes - Grimshaw, 1901
- D. anomelani - Reddy and Krishnamurthy, 1973
- D. anoplostoma - Hardy and Kaneshiro, 1968
- D. antecedens - Kam and Pereira in O'Grady et al., 2003
- D. anthrax - Hardy, 1965
- D. anthurium - Llangari & Rafael, 2020
- D. antillea - Heed, 1962
- D. antioquia - Vilela and Bächli, 2000
- D. antonietae - Tidon-Sklorz and Sene, 2001
- D. aotsukai - Suwito and Watabe, in Suwito, Watabe and Toda, 2013
- D. apag - Vela and Rafael, 2005
- D. apectinata - Duda, 1931
- D. apicalis - Hardy, 1977
- D. apicespinata - Zhang and Gan, 1986
- D. apicipuncta - Hardy, 1965
- D. apicisetae - Hardy, 1965
- D. apiki - Magnacca and O'Grady, 2009
- D. aplophallata - Zhang and Toda in Zhang, Toda and Watabe, 1995
- D. apodasta - Hardy, 1965
- D. apodemata - Okada and Carson, 1983
- D. appendiculata - Malloch, 1934
- D. aquila - Hardy, 1965
- D. aracataca - Vilela and Val, 1983
- D. aracea - Heed and Wheeler, 1957
- D. aragua - Vilela and Pereira, 1982
- D. araicas - Pavan and Nacrur, 1950
- D. araiotrichia - Hardy, 1965
- D. arane - Hunter, 1992
- D. arapuan - da Cunha and Pavan in Pavan and da Cunha, 1947
- D. ararama - Pavan and da Cunha, 1947
- D. arassari - da Cunha and Frota-Pessoa in Pavan and da Cunha, 1947
- D. araucana - Brncic, 1957
- D. arauna - Pavan and Nacrur, 1950
- D. arawakana - Heed, 1962
- D. arboloco - Hunter, 1979
- D. arcosae - Vela and Rafael, 2001
- D. arcuata - Hardy, 1965
- D. argenteifrons - Wheeler, 1954
- D. arizonae - Ruiz, Heed and Wasserman, 1990
- D. artecarina - Takada and Momma, 1975
- D. artigena - Hardy, 1965
- D. asahinai - Okada, 1964
- D. ashburneri - Tsacas, 1984
- D. asiri - Vela and Rafael, 2005
- D. asketostoma - Hardy, 1965
- D. assita - Hardy and Kaneshiro, 1969
- D. asticta - Tsacas, 2004
- D. asymmetrica - Vaz, Vilela and Carvalho, 2018
- D. atacamensis - Brncic and Wheeler in Brncic, 1987
- D. atalaia - Vilela and Sene, 1982
- D. athabasca - Sturtevant and Dobzhansky, 1936
- D. atra - Walker, 1852
- D. atrata - Burla and Pavan, 1953
- D. atrifacies - Hardy and Kaneshiro in Hardy et al., 2001
- D. atrimentum - Hardy and Kaneshiro, 1971
- D. atripex - Bock and Wheeler, 1972
- D. atroscutellata - Hardy, 1966
- D. attenuata - Hardy, 1965
- D. attigua - Hardy and Kaneshiro, 1969
- D. audientis - (Lin and Ting, 1971)
- D. auraria - Peng, 1937
- D. aurea - Patterson and Mainland, 1944
- D. aureata - Wheeler, 1957
- D. aureopallescens - Pipkin, 1964
- D. auriculata - Toda, 1988
- D. austroheptica - Tsaur and Lin, 1991
- D. austrosaltans - Spassky, 1957
- D. avicennai - Maca, 1988
- D. ayauma - Penafiel and Rafael, 2019
- D. azteca - Sturtevant and Dobzhansky, 1936

== B ==
- D. badia - Hardy, 1965
- D. bageshwarensis - Singh, Dash and Fartyal, 2004
- D. bahunde - Tsacas, 1980
- D. bai - Watabe and Liang in Watabe et al., 1990
- D. baimaii - Bock and Wheeler, 1972
- D. bakondjo - Tsacas, 1980
- D. bakoue - Tsacas and Lachaise, 1974
- D. balioptera - Hardy, 1965
- D. balneorum - Sturtevant, 1927
- D. bandeirantorum - Dobzhansky and Pavan, 1943
- D. barbarae - Bock and Wheeler, 1972
- D. barbata - Magnacca and O'Grady, 2009
- D. barutani - Watabe and Liang in Watabe et al., 1990
- D. basimacula - Hardy, 1965
- D. basisetae - Hardy and Kaneshiro, 1968
- D. basisetosa - Hardy, 1965
- D. batmani - Vilela and Bächli, 2005
- D. baucipyga - Lachaise and Chassagnard, 2001
- D. beardsleyi - Hardy, 1965
- D. bella - Lin and Ting, 1971
- D. belladunni - Heed and Krishnamurthy, 1959
- D. beppui - Toda and Peng, 1989
- D. berryi - Cockerell, 1923
- D. bhagamandalensis - Muniyappa, Reddy, and Krishnamurthy, 1981
- D. biarmipes - Malloch, 1924
- D. biauraria - Bock and Wheeler, 1972
- D. bicondyla - Hardy, 1965
- D. bicornuta - Bock and Wheeler, 1972
- D. bifasciata - Pomini, 1940
- D. bifidiprocera - Zhang and Gan, 1986
- D. bifilum - Frota-Pessoa, 1954
- D. bifurca - Patterson and Wheeler, 1942
- D. bifurcada - Hunter, 1992
- D. billheedi - Grimaldi, 2016
- D. bimorpha - Singh and Gupta, 1981
- D. binocularis - Zhang and Toda in Brake and Bachli, 2008
- D. bipectinata - Duda, 1923
- D. bipolita - Hardy, 1965
- D. bipunctata - Patterson and Mainland in Patterson, 1943
- D. birchii - Dobzhansky and Mather, 1961
- D. biseriata - Hardy, 1965
- D. bisetata - Toda, 1988
- D. bishtii - Singh and Negi, 1995
- D. bivibrissae - Toda, 1988
- D. bizonata - Kikkawa and Peng, 1938
- D. blanda - Statz, 1940
- D. blumelae - Pipkin and Heed, 1964
- D. bocainensis - Pavan and da Cunha, 1947
- D. bocainoides - Carson, 1954
- D. bocki - Baimai, 1979
- D. bocqueti - Tsacas and Lachaise, 1974
- D. bodemannae - Pipkin and Heed, 1964
- D. boletina - Duda, 1927
- D. boliviana - Duda, 1927
- D. bomarea - Hunter, 1979
- D. bondarenkoi - Sidorenko, 1993
- D. boraceia - Vilela and do Val, 2004
- D. borborema - Vilela and Sene, 1977
- D. borealis - Patterson, 1952
- D. bostrycha - Hardy, 1965
- D. brachynephros - Okada, 1956
- D. brachytarsa - Chassagnard and Tsacas in Chassagnard et al., 1997
- D. brahmagiriensis - Muniyappa, Reddy, and Krishnamurthy, 1981
- D. breuerae - Rocha, 1971
- D. brevicarinata - Patterson and Wheeler, 1942
- D. brevicilia - Hardy, 1965
- D. brevina - Wheeler, 1981
- D. brevipapilla - Zhang, 2000
- D. brevis - Walker, 1852
- D. brevissima - Hardy, 1965
- D. brevitabula - Zhang and Toda, 1992
- D. brevitarsus - Hardy, 1965
- D. bridwelli - Hardy, 1965
- D. briegeri - Pavan and Breuer, 1954
- D. brncici - Hunter and Hunter, 1964
- D. bromeliae - Sturtevant, 1921
- D. bromelioides - Pavan and da Cunha, 1947
- D. brunettii - Ray-Chaudhuri and Mukherjee, 1941
- D. brunneicrus - Hardy and Kaneshiro in Hardy et al., 2001
- D. brunneifrons - Hardy, 1965
- D. brunneisetae - Hardy, 1965
- D. bunnanda - Schiffer and McEvey, 2006
- D. burlai - Tsacas and Lachaise, 1974
- D. burmae - Toda, 1986
- D. busckii - Coquillett, 1901
- D. butantan - Ratcov, Vilela and Goni, 2017
- D. buzzatii - Patterson and Wheeler, 1942

== C ==
- D. caccabata - Hardy, 1965
- D. cajanuma - Penafiel and Rafael, 2019
- D. calatheae - Vaz, Vilela, Krsticevic and Carvalho, 2014
- D. calceolata - Duda, 1926
- D. calidata - Takada, Beppu and Toda, 1979
- D. californica - Sturtevant, 1923
- D. calloptera - Schiner, 1868
- D. camargoi - Dobzhansky and Pavan in Pavan, 1950
- D. camaronensis - Brncic, 1957
- D. cameroonensis - Grimaldi & Jones, 2020
- D. campylophalla - Tsacas, 2006
- D. canadiana - Takada and Yoon, 1989
- D. canalinea - Patterson and Mainland, 1944
- D. canalinioides - Wheeler, 1957
- D. canavalia - Magnacca and O'Grady, 2008
- D. canescens - Duda, 1927
- D. canipolita - Hardy, 1965
- D. canuta - Hardy, 1965
- D. capitata - Hardy, 1965
- D. capnoptera - Patterson and Mainland, 1944
- D. caponei - Pavan and da Cunha, 1947
- D. capricorni - Dobzhansky and Pavan, 1943
- D. carablanca - Hunter, 1979
- D. carbonaria - Patterson and Wheeler, 1942
- D. carcinophila - Wheeler, 1960
- D. cardini - Sturtevant, 1916
- D. cardinoides - Dobzhansky and Pavan, 1943
- D. caribiana - Heed, 1962
- D. carioca - Vilela and Bächli, 2004
- D. cariouae - Tsacas in Tsacas et al., 1985
- D. caripe - Vilela and Bächli, 2000
- D. carlosvilelai - Vela and Rafael, 2001
- D. carnosa - Hardy, 1965
- D. carolinae - Vilela, 1983
- D. carrolli - Gompel and Kopp, 2018
- D. carsoni - Wheeler, 1957
- D. cartucho - Llangari & Rafael, 2020
- D. carvalhoi - Cabezas, Llangari and Rafael, 2015
- D. cashapamba - Cespedes and Rafael, 2012
- D. cathara - Tsacas, 2004
- D. cauverii - Muniyappa, Reddy and Prakash, 1982
- D. caxarumi - Penafiel and Rafael, 2018
- D. caxiuana - Gottschalk, Martins, Praxedes and Medeiros, 2012
- D. cellaris - Oken, 1815
- D. ceratostoma - Hardy, 1966
- D. cestri - Brncic, 1978
- D. chaetocephala - Hardy and Kaneshiro, 1979
- D. chaetopeza - Hardy, 1965
- D. chamundiensis - Sajjan and Krishnamurthy, 1972
- D. chamundiensis - Sajjan and Krishnamurthy, 1975
- D. changuinolae - Wheeler and Magalhaes, 1962
- D. charmadensis - Gowda and Krishnamurthy, 1972
- D. chauvacae - Tsacas, 1984
- D. cheda - Tan, Hsu and Sheng, 1949
- D. cheongi - Takada and Momma, 1975
- D. chicae - Hardy and Kaneshiro in Hardy et al., 2001
- D. chichu - Penafiel and Rafael, 2019
- D. chimera - Kam and Pereira in O'Grady et al., 2003
- D. chisaca - Hunter, 1989
- D. choachi - Hunter, 1992
- D. chocolata - Yassin & David, in Yassin et al., 2019
- D. chorlavi - Cespedes and Rafael, 2012
- D. ciliaticrus - Hardy, 1965
- D. cilifemorata - Hardy, 1965
- D. cilifera - Hardy and Kaneshiro, 1968
- D. ciliotarsa - Gupta and Gupta, 1990
- D. cilitarsis - Hering, 1940
- D. circumdata - Duda, 1926
- D. clara - Hardy and Kaneshiro in Hardy et al., 2001
- D. clarinervis - Toda, 1986
- D. clavata - Hardy, 1965
- D. clavisetae - ardy, 1966
- D. clavitibia - Hardy, 1965
- D. claytonae - Hardy and Kaneshiro, 1969
- D. clydonia - Hardy, 1965
- D. cnecopleura - Hardy, 1965
- D. coffeata - Williston, 1896
- D. coffeina - Schiner, 1868
- D. cogani - Tsacas and Disney, 1974
- D. cognata - Grimshaw, 1901
- D. colmenares - Hunter, 1989
- D. colobos - Tsacas, 2004
- D. colorata - Walker, 1849
- D. comatifemora - Hardy, 1965
- D. comoe - Burla, 1954
- D. comorensis - Tsacas in Lemeunier et al., 1997
- D. comosa - Wheeler, 1968
- D. condormachay - Vela and Rafael, 2005
- D. confertidentata - Zhang, Li and Feng, 2006
- D. conformis - Hardy, 1965
- D. confutata - Hardy, 1965
- D. conjectura - Hardy, 1965
- D. conspicua - Grimshaw, 1901
- D. constricta - Okada and Carson, 1983
- D. contorta - Hardy, 1965
- D. converga - Heed and Wheeler, 1957
- D. cordata - Sturtevant, 1942
- D. cordeiroi - Brncic, 1978
- D. cornixa - Takada, Momma and Shima, 1973
- D. cornutitarsus - Hardy and Kaneshiro, 1979
- D. coroica - Wasserman, 1962
- D. cosanga - Guillin and Rafael, 2017
- D. couturieri - Tsacas, 2006
- D. cracens - Hardy, 1965
- D. craddockae - Kaneshiro and Kambysellis, 1999
- D. crassa - Patterson and Mainland, 1944
- D. crispipennis - Okada and Carson, 1983
- D. crossoptera - Wheeler and Takada in Wheeler et al., 1962
- D. crucigera - Grimshaw, 1902
- D. cryptica - De and Gupta, 1996
- D. cryptica - Hardy and Kaneshiro in Hardy et al., 2001
- D. cuaso - Bächli, Vilela and Ratcov, 2000
- D. cuauhtemoci - Felix and Dobzhansky in Felix et al., 1976
- D. cubicivittata - Okada, 1966
- D. cundinamarca - Vilela and Bächli, 2000
- D. curiosa - Hardy and Kaneshiro in O'Grady et al., 2001
- D. curta - Chassagnard and Tsacas in Chassagnard et al., 1997
- D. curticilia - Hardy, 1965
- D. curtitarsis - Hardy and Kaneshiro in Hardy et al., 2001
- D. curvapex - Frota-Pessoa, 1954
- D. curvata - Hardy, 1977
- D. curvicapillata - Duda, 1923
- D. curviceps - Okada and Kurokawa, 1957
- D. curvispina - Watabe and Toda, 1984
- D. curvitibia - Hardy, 1965
- D. cuscungu - Vela and Rafael, 2005
- D. cuyuja - Guillin and Rafael, 2015
- D. cuzcoica - Duda, 1927
- D. cyrtoloma - Hardy, 1969

== D ==
- D. dacunhai - Mourao and Bicudo, 1967
- D. daruma - Okada, 1956
- D. dasycnemia - Hardy, 1965
- D. davidgrimaldii - Vilela and Bächli, 1990
- D. davidi - Tsacas, 1975
- D. debilis - Walker, 1849
- D. decemseriata - Hendel, 1936
- D. decolor - Tsacas and Chassagnard, 1994
- D. deflecta - Malloch in Malloch and McAtee, 1924
- D. deloscolorados - Llangari & Rafael, 2020
- D. deltaneuron - Bryan, 1938
- D. demipolita - Hardy, 1965
- D. denieri - Blanchard, 1938
- D. denotata - Hardy, 1965
- D. denruoi - Suwito and Watabe, 2014
- D. denticulata - Bock and Wheeler, 1972
- D. dentilabia - Magnacca and O'Grady, 2009
- D. dentissima - Bock and Wheeler, 1972
- D. desallei - Magnacca and O'Grady, 2009
- D. desavrilia - Tsacas, 1985
- D. desbaratabaile - Hunter, 1979
- D. desertorum - Wasserman, 1962
- D. diama - Burla, 1954
- D. diamphidia - Hardy, 1965
- D. diamphidiopoda - Hardy, 1965
- D. dianensis - Gao, Watabe, Toda, Zhang and Aotsuka, 2003
- D. dicropeza - Hardy and Kaneshiro, 1979
- D. dictena - Tsacas and Chassagnard, 1992
- D. differens - Hardy and Kaneshiro, 1975
- D. diffusa - Hardy, 1965
- D. digressa - Hardy and Kaneshiro, 1968
- D. dilacerata - Becker, 1919
- D. diminuens - Hardy, 1965
- D. dimitra - Tsacas in Tsacas and Lachaise, 1981
- D. dimitroides - Chassagnard and Tsacas in Chassagnard et al., 1997
- D. diplacantha - Tsacas and David, 1977
- D. diplochaeta - Tsacas, 2003
- D. discreta - Hardy and Kaneshiro, 1968
- D. disjuncta - Hardy, 1965
- D. dispar - Mather, 1955
- D. dissimilis - Katoh and Gao, in Katoh et al., 2018
- D. dissita - Hardy, 1965
- D. distinguenda - Hardy, 1965
- D. divaricata - Hardy and Kaneshiro, 1971
- D. dives - Hardy and Kaneshiro in Hardy et al., 2001
- D. divisa - Duda, 1927
- D. dobzhanskii - Patterson, 1943
- D. dolichotarsis - Hardy, 1966
- D. dolomata - Hardy, 1965
- D. dominicana - Ayala, 1965
- D. dominici - Dwivedi, 1982
- D. dorsalis - Walker, 1865
- D. dorsigera - Hardy, 1965
- D. dorsivitta - Walker, 1861
- D. dorsociliata - Hardy, 1965
- D. dossoui - Chassagnard, 1991
- D. dracaenae - Hardy, 1965
- D. dreyfusi - Dobzhansky and Pavan, 1943
- D. dumalis - Hardy, 1965
- D. dumuya - Burla, 1954
- D. dunni - Townsend and Wheeler, 1955
- D. dyaramankana - Burla, 1954
- D. dyula - Burla, 1954

== E ==
- D. echinostoma - Kam and Pereira in O'Grady et al., 2003
- D. ecuatoriana - Vela and Rafael, 2004
- D. editinares - Okada, 1966
- D. elegans - Bock and Wheeler, 1972
- D. eleonorae - Tosi et al., 1990
- D. elliptica - Sturtevant, 1942
- D. ellisoni - Vilela, 1983
- D. elongata - Sturtevant, 1927
- D. emarginata - Sturtevant, 1942
- D. eminentiula - Zhang and Shi in Zhang, Toda and Watabe, 1995
- D. enderbyi - Hutton, 1902
- D. endobranchia - Carson and Wheeler, 1968
- D. engyochracea - Hardy, 1965
- D. enhydrobia - Bächli and Tsacas, 2005
- D. eniwae - Takada, Beppu and Toda, 1979
- D. enoplotarsus - Hardy, 1965
- D. entrichocnema - Hardy, 1965
- D. eohydei - Wasserman, 1962
- D. epiobscura - Parshad and Duggal, 1966
- D. eprocessata - Zhang and Toda in Zhang, Toda and Watabe, 1995
- D. equinoxialis - Dobzhansky, 1946
- D. ercepeae - Tsacas and David, 1975
- D. erebopis - Tsacas, 2004
- D. erecta - Tsacas and Lachaise, 1974
- D. eremophila - Wasserman, 1962
- D. eskoi - Lakovaara and Lankinen, 1974
- D. eugracilis - Bock and Wheeler, 1972
- D. eumecothrix - Hardy, 1965
- D. eupyga - Tsacas, 1981
- D. euronotus - Patterson and Ward, 1952
- D. eurypeza - Hardy, 1965
- D. exiguitata - Takada, Momma and Shima, 1973
- D. eximia - Hardy, 1965
- D. expansa - Hardy, 1965
- D. ezoana - Takada and Okada, 1958

== F ==
- D. facialba - Heed and Wheeler, 1957
- D. facialis - Adams, 1905
- D. fairchildi - Pipkin and Heed, 1964
- D. falleni - Wheeler, 1960
- D. fasciculisetae - Hardy, 1965
- D. fascigera - Hardy and Kaneshiro in Hardy et al., 2001
- D. fasciola - Williston, 1896
- D. fascioloides - Dobzhansky and Pavan, 1943
- D. fastigata - Hardy, 1965
- D. fengkainensis - Chen in Brake and Bachli, 2008
- D. ferruginea - Becker, 1919
- D. ficusphila - Kikkawa and Peng, 1938
- D. fima - Burla, 1954
- D. flavibasis - Hardy, 1965
- D. flavicauda - Toda, 1991
- D. flaviceps - Grimshaw, 1901
- D. flavimedifemur - Zhang and Toda, 1988
- D. flavisternum - Hardy, 1965
- D. flavitibiae - Toda, 1986
- D. flavohirta - Malloch, 1924
- D. flavomontana - Patterson, 1952
- D. flavopilosa - Frey, 1919
- D. flavopinicola - Wheeler, 1954
- D. flavopleuralis - Takada, Momma and Shima, 1973
- D. flexa - Loew, 1866
- D. flexipes - Hardy and Kaneshiro, 1968
- D. florae - Sturtevant, 1916
- D. flumenicola - Watabe and Peng, 1991
- D. fluminensis - Vilela and Bächli, 2004
- D. fluvialis - Toda and Peng, 1989
- D. fontdevilai - Vela and Rafael, 2001
- D. forficata - Hardy and Kaneshiro, 1979
- D. formella - Hardy and Kaneshiro, 1972
- D. formosana - Duda, 1926
- D. formosana - Sturtevant, 1927
- D. fraburu - Burla, 1954
- D. fragilis - Wheeler, 1949
- D. franii - Hunter, 1989
- D. freidbergi - Grimaldi & Jones, 2020
- D. freilejoni - Hunter, 1979
- D. freiremaiai - Vilela and Bächli, 2000
- D. freycinetiae - Hardy, 1965
- D. frolovae - Wheeler, 1949
- D. fronto - Walker, 1852
- D. frotapessoai - Vilela and Bächli, 1990
- D. fruhstorferi - Duda, 1924
- D. fulgida - Hardy and Kaneshiro in Hardy et al., 2001
- D. fulva - Watabe and Li in Watabe et al., 1993
- D. fulvalineata - Patterson and Wheeler, 1942
- D. fulvimacula - Patterson and Mainland, 1944
- D. fulvimaculoides - Wasserman and Wilson, 1957
- D. fumifera - Wheeler and Takada, 1964
- D. fumipennis - Duda, 1925
- D. fundita - Hardy, 1965
- D. fundomaculata - Duda, 1925
- D. funebris - (Fabricius, 1787)
- D. fungiperda - Hardy, 1966
- D. furcatarsus - Hardy and Kaneshiro, 1979
- D. furva - Hardy, 1965
- D. furvifacies - Hardy, 1965
- D. fusca - Coquillett, 1900
- D. fuscicostata - Okada, 1966
- D. fuscifrons - Hardy, 1965
- D. fuscipennis - Duda, 1927
- D. fuscoamoeba - Bryan, 1934
- D. fuscoapex - Hardy, 1965
- D. fuscolineata - Duda, 1925
- D. fusticula - Hardy, 1965
- D. fustiformis - Zhang and Liang, 1993
- D. fusus - Okada, 1988
- D. fuyamai - Toda, 1991

== G ==
- D. gagne - Kam and Pereira in O'Grady et al., 2003
- D. gangotrii - Muniyappa and Reddy, 1981
- D. gani - Liang and Zhang in Watabe et al., 1990
- D. gapudi - Ruiz-Fiegalan, 2003
- D. gasici - Brncic, 1957
- D. gata - Lachaise and Chassagnard, 2001
- D. gaucha - Jaeger and Salzano, 1953
- D. gemmula - Hardy, 1965
- D. gentica - Wheeler and Takada in Wheeler et al., 1962
- D. gibberosa - Patterson and Mainland in Patterson, 1943
- D. gibbinsi - Aubertin, 1937
- D. gigas - Duda, 1925
- D. gilvilateralis - Hardy, 1965
- D. giriensis - Prakash and Reddy, 1977
- D. glabra - Chen & Gao, 2015
- D. glabriapex - Hardy and Kaneshiro, 1968
- D. gladius - Magnacca and O'Grady, 2009
- D. gorokaensis - Okada and Carson, 1982
- D. goureaui - Hardy in Hardy and Kaneshiro, 1972
- D. gouveai - Tidon-Sklorz and Sene, 2001
- D. gracilipalpis - Katoh and Gao, in Katoh et al., 2018
- D. gradata - Hardy and Kaneshiro, 1968
- D. greeni - Bock and Wheeler, 1972
- D. greerae - Pipkin and Heed, 1964
- D. grimshawi - Oldenberg, 1914
- D. griseicollis - Becker, 1919
- D. griseolineata - Duda, 1927
- D. guacamaya - Bächli and Vilela, 2002
- D. guacamayos - Guillin and Rafael, 2017
- D. guajalito - Llangari & Rafael, 2020
- D. guanche - Monclus, 1976
- D. guangdongensis - Toda and Peng, 1989
- D. guaraja - King, 1947
- D. guaru - Dobzhansky and Pavan, 1943
- D. guayllabambae - Rafael and Arcos, 1988
- D. gubleri - Hardy, 1966
- D. gundensis - Prakash and Reddy, 1977
- D. gunungcola - Sultana, Kimura, and Toda, 1999
- D. guptai - Dwivedi, 1979
- D. guttifera - Walker, 1849
- D. gymnobasis - Hardy and Kaneshiro, 1971
- D. gymnophallus - Hardy and Kaneshiro, 1975

== H ==
- D. halapepe - Magnacca and O'Grady, 2008
- D. haleakalae - Grimshaw, 1901
- D. hamatofila - Patterson and Wheeler, 1942
- D. hamifera - Hardy and Kaneshiro, 1968
- D. hanaulae - Hardy, 1969
- D. hansoni - Pipkin, 1964
- D. hansonioides - Pipkin, 1966
- D. hawaiiensis - Grimshaw, 1901
- D. heedi - Hardy and Kaneshiro, 1971
- D. hegdii - Achumi, Lal and Yenisetti, 2011
- D. hei - Watabe and Peng, 1991
- D. helvetica - Burla, 1948
- D. hemianthrax - Hardy and Kaneshiro in Hardy et al., 2001
- D. hemipeza - Hardy, 1965
- D. hendeli - Vilela and Bächli, 1990
- D. hermioneae - Vilela, 1983
- D. heterobristalis - Tan, Hsu and Sheng, 1949
- D. heteroneura - erkins, 1910
- D. hexachaetae - Hardy, 1965
- D. hexaspina - Singh, Dash and Fartyal, 2004
- D. hexastigma - Patterson and Mainland, 1944
- D. hexastriata - Tan, Hsu and Sheng, 1949
- D. hideakii - Gao & Toda, in Gao, Tanabe & Toda, 2009
- D. hirticoxa - Hardy, 1965
- D. hirtipalpus - Hardy and Kaneshiro, 1968
- D. hirtipes - Lamb, 1914
- D. hirtitarsus - Hardy, 1965
- D. hirtitibia - Hardy, 1965
- D. histrio - Meigen, 1830
- D. hollisae - Vilela and Pereira, 1992
- D. hoozani - Duda, 1923
- D. huancavilcae - Rafael and Arcos, 1989
- D. huangshanensis - Watabe in Brake and Bachli, 2008
- D. huayla - Suyo, Pilares and Vasquez, 1988
- D. huaylasi - Pla and Fontdevila in Fontdevila et al., 1990
- D. hubeiensis - Sperlich and Watabe in Watabe and Sperlich, 1997
- D. huckinsi - Etges and Heed in Etges et al., 2001
- D. huichole - Etges and Heed in Etges at al., 2001
- D. huilliche - Brncic, 1957
- D. humeralis - Grimshaw, 1901
- D. hyalipennis - Duda, 1927
- D. hydei - Sturtevant, 1921
- D. hydroessa - Bächli and Tsacas, 2005
- D. hypandrilata - Grimaldi & Jones, 2020
- D. hypercephala - Gao & Toda, in Gao, Tanabe & Toda, 2009
- D. hyperpolychaeta - Okada, 1988
- D. hypocausta - Osten Sacken, 1882
- D. hypomelana - Okada and Carson, 1983
- D. hystricosa - Hardy and Kaneshiro, 1969

== I ==
- D. ichinosei - Zhang and Toda in Zhang, Toda and Watabe, 1995
- D. ichubamba - Vela and Rafael, 2005
- D. icteroscuta - Wheeler, 1949
- D. ifestia - Tsacas, 1984
- D. iki - Bryan, 1934
- D. illata - Walker, 1860
- D. illota - Williston, 1896
- D. illusiopolita - Hardy, 1965
- D. imaii - Moriwaki and Okada in Moriwaki et al., 1967
- D. imitator - Hardy, 1965
- D. immacularis - Okada, 1966
- D. immigrans - Sturtevant, 1921
- D. imparisetae - Hardy, 1965
- D. improcera - Hardy, 1965
- D. impudica - Duda, 1927
- D. inca - Dobzhansky and Pavan, 1943
- D. inciliata - Hardy and Kaneshiro, 1968
- D. incognita - Hardy, 1965
- D. incompleta - Hardy, 1965
- D. incompta - Wheeler and Takada in Wheeler et al., 1962
- D. incongruens - Magnacca and O'Grady, 2009
- D. inebria - Kam and Pereira in O'Grady et al., 2003
- D. inedita - Hardy, 1965
- D. inexspectata - Tsacas, 1988
- D. infuscata - Grimshaw, 1901
- D. ingens - Hardy and Kaneshiro, 1971
- D. ingrata - Haliday, 1833
- D. ingrica - Hackman, 1957
- D. innubila - Spencer in Patterson, 1943
- D. inopinata - Lachaise and Chassagnard, 2002
- D. insignita - Hardy, 1965
- D. insularis - Dobzhansky in Dobzhansky et al., 1957
- D. inti - Cabezas, Llangari and Rafael, 2015
- D. intillacta - Cabezas and Rafael, 2013
- D. involuta - Hardy, 1965
- D. iroko - Burla, 1954
- D. ironensis - Bock and Parsons, 1978
- D. ischnotrix - Hardy, 1965
- D. itacorubi - Doge, Gottschalk and Valente, 2011
- D. ivai - Vilela, 1983

== J ==
- D. jagri - Prakash and Reddy, 1979
- D. jambiya - Grimaldi & Jones, 2020
- D. jambulina - Parshad and Paika, 1964
- D. johnstonae - Pipkin and Heed, 1964
- D. joycei - Hardy, 1965
- D. jucunda - Lamb, 1914

== K ==
- D. kahania - Magnacca and O'Grady, 2008
- D. kallima - Wheeler, 1957
- D. kambysellisi - Hardy and Kaneshiro, 1969
- D. kanaka - Tsacas, 1988
- D. kanapiae - Bock and Wheeler, 1972
- D. kanekoi - Watabe and Higuchi, 1979
- D. kaneshiroi - Hardy, 1977
- D. karakasa - Watabe and Liang in Watabe et al., 1990
- D. kasha - Penafiel and Rafael, 2019
- D. kashmirensis - Kumar and Gupta, 1985
- D. kauaiensis - Magnacca and O'Grady, 2008
- D. kauluai - Bryan, 1934
- D. kepulauana - Wheeler in Wilson et al., 1969
- D. kerteszina - Duda, 1925
- D. khansuensis - Singh, Dash and Fartyal, 2004
- D. khaoyana - Bock and Wheeler, 1972
- D. kikalaeleele - Lapoint, Magnacca and O'Grady, 2009
- D. kikiko - Magnacca in Magnacca and Price, 2012
- D. kikkawai - Burla, 1954
- D. kilimanjarica - Lachaise and Chassagnard, 2001
- D. kinabaluana - Takada, Momma and Shima, 1973
- D. kinoole - Magnacca in Magnacca and Price, 2012
- D. kitagawai - Toda, 1986
- D. kitumensis - Tsacas in Tsacas et al., 1985
- D. kivuensis - Tsacas, 1980
- D. koepferae - Fontdevila and Wasserman in Fontdevila et al., 1988
- D. kohkoa - Wheeler in Wilson et al., 1969
- D. kokeensis - Hardy, 1966
- D. komohana - Magnacca and O'Grady, 2009
- D. konaensis - Magnacca and O'Grady, 2008
- D. korefae - Vela and Rafael, 2004
- D. kraussi - Hardy, 1965
- D. krimbasi - Tsacas in Tsacas et al., 1985
- D. krugi - Pavan and Breuer, 1954
- D. kualapa - Magnacca and O'Grady, 2008
- D. kualii - Magnacca and O'Grady, 2009
- D. kuhao - Magnacca and O'Grady, 2008
- D. kulango - Burla, 1954
- D. kulouriensis - Fartyal and Singh in Brake and Bachli, 2008
- D. kulouriensis - Fartyal and Singh, 2007
- D. kulouriensis - Fartyal and Singh, 2007
- D. kuntzei - Duda, 1924
- D. kuoni - Burla, 1954
- D. kurillakta - Penafiel and Rafael, 2019
- D. kurseongensis - Gupta and Singh, 1977
- D. kweichowensis - Tan, Hsu and Sheng, 1949

== L ==
- D. lacertosa - Okada, 1956
- D. lachaisei - Tsacas, 1984
- D. lacicola - Patterson, 1944
- D. laciniosa - Hardy, 1965
- D. lacteicornis - Okada, 1965
- D. lamellitarsis - Duda, 1936
- D. lamottei - Tsacas, 1980
- D. lanaiensis - Grimshaw, 1901
- D. larifuga - Hardy, 1965
- D. lasiopoda - Hardy and Kaneshiro, 1975
- D. latebuccata - Duda, 1927
- D. latecarinata - Duda, 1927
- D. latifrons - Adams, 1905
- D. latifshahi - Gupta and Ray-Chaudhuri, 1970
- D. latigena - Hardy, 1965
- D. latipaenula - Okada and Carson, 1982
- D. lauoho - Magnacca and O'Grady, 2008
- D. lauta - Wheeler and Takada in Wheeler et al., 1962
- D. lehrmanae - Madi-Ravazzi et al., 2021
- D. lelolua - Magnacca and O'Grady, 2009
- D. lemniscata - Hardy, 1965
- D. leoni - Pipkin, 1964
- D. leonis - Patterson and Wheeler, 1942
- D. leontia - Tsacas and David, 1977
- D. lepidobregma - Hardy, 1965
- D. leticiae - Pipkin, 1967
- D. leukorrhyna - Pipkin, 1964
- D. levii - Tsacas, 1988
- D. liae - Toda and Peng, 1989
- D. libellulosa - Tsacas and Legrand, 1979
- D. lichuanensis - Zhang and Liang, 1995
- D. limbata - von Roser, 1840
- D. limbinervis - Duda, 1925
- D. limbiventris - Duda, 1925
- D. limensis - Pavan and Patterson in Pavan and da Cunha, 1947
- D. limingi - Gao, Watabe, Toda, Zhang and Aotsuka, 2003
- D. limitata - Hardy and Kaneshiro, 1968
- D. lindae - Wheeler, 1968
- D. linearepleta - Patterson and Wheeler, 1942
- D. linearidentata - Toda, 1986
- D. linearis - Walker, 1852
- D. lineata - van der Wulp, 1881
- D. lineolata - de Meijere, 1914
- D. lineosetae - Hardy and Kaneshiro, 1968
- D. lini - Bock and Wheeler, 1972
- D. liophallus - Hardy and Kaneshiro, 1968
- D. lissodora - Hardy and Kaneshiro in Hardy et al., 2001
- D. littoralis - Meigen, 1830
- D. liui - Chen, 1988
- D. lividinervis - Duda, 1923
- D. lobatopalpus - Kam and Pereira in O'Grady et al., 2003
- D. loewi - Vilela and Bächli, 2000
- D. loiciana - Tsacas and Chassagnard, 2000
- D. longicornis - Patterson and Wheeler, 1942
- D. longicrinis - Lachaise and Chassagnard, 2002
- D. longifrons - Duda, 1923
- D. longipalpus - Magnacca and O'Grady, 2008
- D. longipectinata - Takada, Momma and Shima, 1973
- D. longiperda - Kambysellis, 1993
- D. longiserrata - Toda, 1988
- D. longiseta - Grimshaw, 1901
- D. longisetae - Zhang, Lin and Gan, 1990
- D. longissima - Okada and Carson, 1983
- D. longitarsis - Duda, 1931
- D. lowei - Heed, Crumpacker and Ehrman, 1968
- D. lucipennis - Lin in Bock and Wheeler, 1972
- D. lugubripennis - Duda, 1927
- D. luguensis - Gao, Watabe, Toda, Zhang and Aotsuka, 2003
- D. luisserrai - Vilela and Bächli, 2002
- D. lummei - Hackman, 1972
- D. lusaltans - Magalhaes, 1962
- D. luteola - Hardy, 1965
- D. lutescens - Okada, 1975
- D. lutzii - Sturtevant, 1916

== M ==
- D. machachensis - Vela and Rafael, 2001
- D. machalilla - Acurio Rafael, Cespedes and Ruiz, 2013
- D. macquarti - Wheeler, 1981
- D. macrochaetae - Hardy, 1965
- D. macropolia - Patterson and Mainland, 1944
- D. macroptera - Patterson and Wheeler, 1942
- D. macrospina - Stalker and Spencer, 1939
- D. macrothrix - Hardy and Kaneshiro, 1968
- D. maculifrons - Duda, 1927
- D. maculinotata - Okada, 1956
- D. madeirensis - Monclus, 1984
- D. madikerii - Muniyappa and Reddy, 1981
- D. maemae - Kam and Pereira in O'Grady et al., 2003
- D. magalhaesi - Mourao and Bicudo, 1967
- D. maggulae - Gupta and Sundaran, 1990
- D. magnabadia - Patterson and Mainland in Patterson, 1943
- D. magnaquinaria - Wheeler, 1954
- D. magnimacula - Hardy, 1965
- D. magnipalpa - Hardy, 1965
- D. mahui - Magnacca and O'Grady, 2008
- D. mainlandi - Patterson, 1943
- D. majtoi - Ruiz-Fiegalan, 2003
- D. makawao - Magnacca and O'Grady, 2008
- D. malagassya - Tsacas and Rafael, 1982
- D. malagasy - Grimaldi & Jones, 2020
- D. malayana - (Takada, 1976)
- D. malele - Magnacca and O'Grady, 2008
- D. malerkotliana - Parshad and Paika, 1964
- D. mambilla - Tsacas, 1980
- D. mandibulata - Magnacca and O'Grady, 2009
- D. mangabeirai - Malogolowkin, 1951
- D. manni - Grimaldi, 2016
- D. mapiriensis - Vilela and Bächli, 1990
- D. maracaya - Wheeler, 1957
- D. margarita - Hunter, 1979
- D. mariaehelenae - Vilela, 1984
- D. mariettae - Vilela, 1983
- D. martensis - Wasserman and Wilson, 1957
- D. martinsae - Correa et al., 2021
- D. maryensis - Gupta and Dwivedi, 1980
- D. matae - Tsacas, 1980
- D. mathisi - Vilela, 1983
- D. matileana - Tsacas, 2002
- D. matilei - Tsacas, 1974
- D. mauritiana - Tsacas and David, 1974
- D. mawaena - Magnacca and O'Grady, 2008
- D. maya - Heed and O'Grady, 2000
- D. mayaguana - Vilela, 1983
- D. mayri - Mather and Dobzhansky, 1962
- D. mcclintockae - Pipkin, 1964
- D. mecocnemia - Hardy, 1965
- D. medialis - Hardy, 1966
- D. mediana - Hardy, 1965
- D. mediobandes - Dwivedi and Gupta, 1980
- D. medioconstricta - Watabe, Zhang and Gan in Watabe et al., 1990
- D. mediocris - Frota-Pessoa, 1954
- D. mediodelta - Heed and Wheeler, 1957
- D. mediodiffusa - Heed and Wheeler, 1957
- D. medioimpressa - Frota-Pessoa, 1954
- D. medioobscurata - Duda, 1925
- D. medioparva - Heed and Wheeler, 1957
- D. mediopicta - Frota-Pessoa, 1954
- D. mediopictoides - Heed and Wheeler, 1957
- D. mediopunctata - Dobzhansky and Pavan, 1943
- D. mediosignata - Dobzhansky and Pavan, 1943
- D. mediostriata - Duda, 1925
- D. mediovittata - Frota-Pessoa, 1954
- D. megalagitans - Wheeler and Magalhaes, 1962
- D. megapyga - Tsacas, 1981
- D. megaspis - Bezzi, 1908
- D. megasticta - Hardy, 1965
- D. meitanensis - Tan, Hsu and Sheng, 1949
- D. melanica - Sturtevant, 1916
- D. melanissima - Sturtevant, 1916
- D. melanocephala - ardy, 1966
- D. melanogaster - Meigen, 1830
- D. melanoloma - Hardy, 1965
- D. melanopedis - Hardy, 1965
- D. melanoptera - Duda, 1927
- D. melanosoma - Grimshaw, 1901
- D. melanura - Miller, 1944
- D. melina - Wheeler, 1962
- D. mellea - Becker, 1919
- D. mercatorum - Patterson and Wheeler, 1942
- D. meridiana - Patterson and Wheeler, 1942
- D. meridionalis - Wasserman, 1962
- D. merina - Tsacas in Lemeunier et al., 1997
- D. merzi - Vilela and Bächli, 2002
- D. mesophragmatica - Duda, 1927
- D. mesostigma - Frota-Pessoa, 1954
- D. metasetigerata - Gupta and Kumar, 1986
- D. mettleri - Heed, 1977
- D. metzii - Sturtevant, 1921
- D. mexicana - Macquart, 1843
- D. mexiflora - Grimaldi, 2016
- D. microdenticulata - Panigrahy and Gupta, 1983
- D. microlabis - Seguy, 1938
- D. micromelanica - Patterson in Sturtevant and Novitski, 1941
- D. micromettleri - Heed, 1989
- D. micromyia - Hardy and Kaneshiro, 1975
- D. micropectinata - Takada and Momma, 1975
- D. microralis - Tsacas in Tsacas and Lachaise, 1981
- D. milleri - Magalhaes, 1962
- D. milolii - Magnacca and O'Grady, 2008
- D. mimetica - Bock and Wheeler, 1972
- D. mimica - Hardy, 1965
- D. mimiconformis - Hardy, 1965
- D. mimiconfutata - Hardy, 1965
- D. minangkabau - Zhang and Toda in Zhang, Toda and Watabe, 1995
- D. minuta - Walker, 1852
- D. miranda - Dobzhansky, 1935
- D. misi - Penafiel and Rafael, 2018
- D. mitchelli - Hardy, 1965
- D. mitis - Curran, 1936
- D. mojavensis - Patterson in Patterson and Crow, 1940
- D. moju - Pavan, 1950
- D. mojuoides - Wasserman, 1962
- D. moli - Magnacca in Magnacca and Price, 2012
- D. molokaiensis - Grimshaw, 1901
- D. momortica - Graber, 1957
- D. monieri - McEvey and Tsacas in McEvey et al., 1987
- D. monochaeta - Sturtevant, 1927
- D. monocolor - Wheeler, 1981
- D. monsterae - Vilela and Prieto, 2018
- D. montana - Patterson and Wheeler, 1942
- D. montevidensis - Goni and Vilela, 2016
- D. montgomeryi - Hardy and Kaneshiro, 1971
- D. montium - de Meijere, 1916
- D. morelia - Vilela and Bächli, 2004
- D. morena - Frota-Pessoa, 1954
- D. moriwakii - Okada and Kurokawa, 1957
- D. mucunae - Okada and Carson, 1982
- D. mukteshwarensis - Joshi, Fartyal and Singh, 2005
- D. mulleri - Sturtevant, 1921
- D. mulli - Perreira and Kaneshiro, 1991
- D. multiciliata - Hardy and Kaneshiro in Hardy et al., 2001
- D. multidentata - Watabe and Zhang in Watabe et al., 1990
- D. multispina - Okada, 1956
- D. munda - Spencer, 1942
- D. murphyi - Hardy and Kaneshiro, 1969
- D. musae - Hardy, 1965
- D. musaphilia - Hardy, 1965
- D. mutica - Toda, 1988
- D. myamaungi - Toda, 1991
- D. mycethophila - Goureau, 1865
- D. mylenae - David and Yassin, in Yassin et al., 2019
- D. mysorensis - Reddy and Krishnamurthy, 1970

== N ==
- D. nagarholensis - Prakash and Reddy, 1980
- D. nainitalensis - Singh and Bhatt, 1988
- D. nakanoi - Zhang and Toda in Zhang, Toda and Watabe, 1995
- D. nalomano - Magnacca and O'Grady, 2009
- D. nanella - Hardy, 1965
- D. nannoptera - Wheeler, 1949
- D. napoensis - Guillin and Rafael, 2015
- D. nappae - Vilela, Valente and Basso-da-Silva, 2004
- D. narragansett - Sturtevant and Dobzhansky, 1936
- D. nasuta - Lamb, 1914
- D. nasutoides - Okada, 1964
- D. natasha - Gornostayev, 1992
- D. navojoa - Ruiz, Heed and Wasserman in Ruiz et al., 1990
- D. nebulosa - Sturtevant, 1916
- D. neoalagitans - Wheeler and Magalhaes, 1962
- D. neoamaguana - Guillin and Rafael, 2017
- D. neoasahinai - Watada and Kondo, in Watada et al., 2011
- D. neoasiri - Figuero and Rafael, 2013
- D. neobaimai - Singh and Dash, 1998
- D. neobusckii - Toda, 1986
- D. neocapnoptera - Figuero and Rafael, 2013
- D. neocardini - Streisinger, 1946
- D. neochracea - Wheeler, 1959
- D. neoclavisetae - Perreira and Kaneshiro, 1991
- D. neocordata - Magalhaes, 1956
- D. neoelegans - Gupta and Singh, 1977
- D. neoelliptica - Pavan and Magalhaes in Pavan, 1950
- D. neogata - Lachaise and Chassagnard, 2001
- D. neogrimshawi - Hardy and Kaneshiro, 1968
- D. neoguaramunu - Frydenberg, 1956
- D. neohydei - Wasserman, 1962
- D. neohypocausta - Lin and Wheeler in Lin and Tseng, 1973
- D. neoimmigrans - Gai and Krishnamurthy, 1982
- D. neokadai - Kaneko and Takada, 1966
- D. neokhaoyana - Singh and Dash, 1998
- D. neokuntzei - Singh and Gupta, 1981
- D. neolacteicornis - Hegde and Krishna in Hegde et al., 1999
- D. neomitra - Chassagnard and Tsacas in Chassagnard et al., 1997
- D. neomorpha - Heed and Wheeler, 1957
- D. neonasuta - Sajjan and Krishnamurthy, 1972
- D. neoperkinsi - Hardy and Kaneshiro, 1968
- D. neopicta - Hardy and Kaneshiro, 1968
- D. neoprosaltans - Guillin and Rafael, 2017
- D. neorepleta - Patterson and Wheeler, 1942
- D. neosaltans - Pavan and Magalhaes in Pavan, 1950
- D. neosignata - Kumar and Gupta, 1988
- D. neotestacea - Grimaldi, James and Jaenike, 1992
- D. neotrapezifrons - Ranganath, Krishnamurthy and Hegde, 1983
- D. neoyanayuyu - Guillin and Rafael, 2017
- D. nepalensis - Okada, 1955
- D. nesiota - Wheeler and Takada in Wheeler et al., 1962
- D. nesoetes - Bock and Wheeler, 1972
- D. neutralis - Hardy, 1965
- D. ngemba - Tsacas, 1980
- D. nigella - Hardy, 1965
- D. nigra - Grimshaw, 1901
- D. nigrasplendens - Pipkin, 1964
- D. nigrialata - Takada, Momma and Shima, 1973
- D. nigribasis - Hardy, 1969
- D. nigriceps - Meigen, 1838
- D. nigricincta - Frota-Pessoa, 1954
- D. nigricruria - Patterson and Mainland in Patterson, 1943
- D. nigriculter - Okada, 1988
- D. nigridentata - Watabe, Toda and Peng in Zhang, Toda and Watabe, 1995
- D. nigrifemur - Duda, 1927
- D. nigrilineata - Angus, 1967
- D. nigripalpus - Hardy, 1965
- D. nigritarsus - Hardy, 1965
- D. nigrocirrus - Hardy, 1965
- D. nigrodigita - (Lin and Ting, 1971)
- D. nigrodumosa - Wasserman and Fontdevila in Fontdevila et al., 1990
- D. nigrodunni - Heed and Wheeler, 1957
- D. nigrohydei - Patterson and Wheeler, 1942
- D. nigromaculata - Kikkawa and Peng, 1938
- D. nigromelanica - Patterson and Wheeler, 1942
- D. nigropleuralis - Takada, Momma and Shima, 1973
- D. nigropolita - Hardy, 1965
- D. nigrosaltans - Magalhaes, 1962
- D. nigrosparsa - Strobl, 1898
- D. nigrospinipes - Grimaldi & Jones, 2020
- D. nigrospiracula - Patterson and Wheeler, 1942
- D. nigua - Cabezas, Llangari and Rafael, 2015
- D. nikananu - Burla, 1954
- D. nina - Cabezas and Rafael, 2015
- D. ninarumi - Vela and Rafael, 2005
- D. nitida - Tsacas and Chassagnard, 1994
- D. nitidapex - Bigot, 1891
- D. niveifrons - Okada and Carson, 1982
- D. nixifrons - Tan, Hsu and Sheng, 1949
- D. nodosa - Duda, 1926
- D. notostriata - Okada, 1966
- D. novamexicana - Patterson, 1941
- D. novaspinofera - Gupta and Singh, 1979
- D. novazonata - Gupta and Dwivedi, 1980
- D. novemaristata - Dobzhansky and Pavan, 1943
- D. novitskii - Sulerud and Miller, 1966
- D. nubiluna - Wheeler, 1949
- D. nukea - Magnacca in Magnacca and Price, 2012
- D. nullilineata - Zhang and Toda, 1988
- D. nutrita - Duda, 1935
- D. nyinyii - Toda, 1991

== O ==
- D. oahuensis - rimshaw, 1901
- D. obatai - Hardy and Kaneshiro, 1972
- D. obscura - Fallen, 1823
- D. obscurata - de Meijere, 1911
- D. obscuricolor - Duda, 1927
- D. obscurinervis - Toda, 1986
- D. obscuripes - rimshaw, 1901
- D. ocampoae - Ruiz-Fiegalan, 2003
- D. occidentalis - Spencer, 1942
- D. ocellata - Hardy and Kaneshiro, 1969
- D. ochracea - Grimshaw, 1901
- D. ochrifrons - Duda, 1924
- D. ochrobasis - Hardy and Kaneshiro, 1968
- D. ochrogaster - Chassagnard in Chassagnard and Groseille, 1992
- D. ochropleura - Hardy and Kaneshiro in Hardy et al., 2001
- D. odontophallus - Hardy and Kaneshiro, 1968
- D. ogradi - Vela and Rafael, 2004
- D. ogumai - Zannat and Toda, 2002
- D. ohnishii - Zannat and Toda, 2002
- D. okadai - Takada, 1959
- D. okala - Magnacca and O'Grady, 2008
- D. olaae - Grimshaw, 1901
- D. omnivora - Magnacca and O'Grady, 2009
- D. onca - Dobzhansky and Pavan, 1943
- D. onychophora - Duda, 1927
- D. ophthalmitis - Tsacas, 2007
- D. opuhe - Magnacca in Magnacca and Price, 2012
- D. orascopa - Magnacca and O'Grady, 2009
- D. oreas - Hardy, 1965
- D. oreia - Tsacas, 1980
- D. orena - Tsacas and David, 1978
- D. orestes - Hardy, 1965
- D. oribatis - Tsacas, 1980
- D. orientacea - Grimaldi, James and Jaenike, 1992
- D. oritisa - Chen, 1990
- D. orkui - Brncic and Koref-Santibanez, 1957
- D. ornata - Meigen, 1830
- D. ornata - Hardy and Kaneshiro, 1969
- D. ornatifrons - Duda, 1927
- D. ornatipennis - Williston, 1896
- D. orosa - Bock and Wheeler, 1972
- D. orphnaea - Tsacas, 2001
- D. orphnopeza - Hardy and Kaneshiro, 1968
- D. orthofascia - Hardy and Kaneshiro, 1968
- D. orthophallata - Katoh, Toda and Gao, in Katoh et al., 2018
- D. orthoptera - Hardy, 1965
- D. oshimai - Choo and Nakamura, 1973
- D. othoni - Pipkin, 1964
- D. ovilongata - Gupta and Gupta, 1991

== P ==
- D. pachea - Patterson and Wheeler, 1942
- D. pachneissa - Tsacas, 2002
- D. pachuca - Wasserman, 1962
- D. padangensis - Zhang and Toda in Zhang, Toda and Watabe, 1995
- D. paenehamifera - Hardy and Kaneshiro, 1969
- D. pagliolii - Cordeiro, 1963
- D. pagoda - Toda, 1988
- D. paharpaniensis - Singh, Dash and Fartyal, 2004
- D. painii - Singh and Negi, 1995
- D. pallidifrons - Wheeler in Wilson et al., 1969
- D. pallidipennis - Dobzhansky and Pavan, 1943
- D. pallidosa - Bock and Wheeler, 1972
- D. pallipes - Dufour, 1846
- D. palmata - Takada, Momma and Shima, 1973
- D. palniensis - Hegde and Shakunthala in Hegde et al., 1999
- D. palustris - Spencer, 1942
- D. panamensis - Malloch, 1926
- D. pandora - McEvey and Schiffer, 2015
- D. panina - Magnacca and O'Grady, 2008
- D. panoanoa - Magnacca and O'Grady, 2008
- D. papaalai - Magnacca and O'Grady, 2008
- D. papala - Magnacca and O'Grady, 2008
- D. papallacta - Figuero and Rafael, 2013
- D. papei - Bächli and Vilela, 2002
- D. papilla - Zhang and Shi in Zhang and Toda, 1992
- D. pappobolusae - Figuero, Leon, Rafael and Cespedes, 2012
- D. paraanthrax - Hardy and Kaneshiro in Hardy et al., 2001
- D. parabipectinata - Bock, 1971
- D. parabocainensis - Carson, 1954
- D. paracanalinea - Wheeler, 1957
- D. parachrogaster - Patterson and Mainland in Patterson, 1943
- D. paracracens - Hardy and Kaneshiro, 1979
- D. paragata - Lachaise and Chassagnard, 2001
- D. paraguayensis - Duda, 1927
- D. paraguttata - Thompson in Wheeler, 1957
- D. paraimmigrans - Gai and Krishnamurthy, 1986
- D. paraitacorubi - Doge, Gottschalk and Valente, 2011
- D. parakuntzei - Okada, 1973
- D. paralongifera - Gupta and Singh, 1981
- D. paralutea - Bock and Wheeler, 1972
- D. paramanni - Grimaldi, 2016
- D. paramarginata - Singh, Dash and Fartyal, 2004
- D. paramediostriata - Townsend and Wheeler, 1955
- D. paramelanica - Patterson, 1943
- D. paramelanica - Griffen, 1942
- D. paramelanica - Patterson, 1942
- D. paranaensis - Barros, 1950
- D. parannularis - Vilela and Bächli, 1990
- D. parapallidosa - Tobari, in Matsuda and Tobari, 2009
- D. parasaltans - Magalhaes, 1956
- D. parasignata - Takada, Momma and Shima, 1973
- D. paratarsata - Vilela, 1985
- D. paraviaristata - Takada, Momma and Shima, 1973
- D. paravibrissina - Duda, 1924
- D. parazonata - Gupta and Dwivedi, 1980
- D. parisiena - Heed and Grimaldi, 1991
- D. parthenogenetica - Stalker, 1953
- D. parviprocessata - Toda, 1986
- D. parvula - Bock and Wheeler, 1972
- D. pasochoensis - Vela and Rafael, 2001
- D. patacorona - Vela and Rafael, 2005
- D. paucicilia - Hardy and Kaneshiro, 1971
- D. paucilineata - Burla, 1957
- D. paucipuncta - Grimshaw, 1901
- D. paucitarsus - Hardy and Kaneshiro, 1979
- D. paucula - Hardy, 1965
- D. pauliceia - Ratcov and Vilela, 2007
- D. paulistorum - Dobzhansky and Pavan in Burla et al., 1949
- D. paunii - Singh and Negi, 1989
- D. pavani - Brncic, 1957
- D. pavlovskiana - Kastritsis and Dobzhansky, 1967
- D. pectinifera - Wheeler and Takada, 1964
- D. pectinitarsus - Hardy, 1965
- D. pedroi - Vilela, 1984
- D. pegasa - Wasserman, 1962
- D. peixotoi - Vaz, Vilela and Carvalho, 2018
- D. pellewae - Pipkin and Heed, 1964
- D. peloristoma - Magnacca and O'Grady, 2009
- D. penicillipennis - Takada, Momma and Shima, 1973
- D. peniculipedis - Hardy, 1965
- D. penidentata - Singh and Gupta, 1981
- D. peninsularis - Patterson and Wheeler, 1942
- D. penispina - Grimaldi, 2016
- D. penispina - Gupta and Singh, 1979
- D. pennae - Bock and Wheeler, 1972
- D. penniclubata - Singh and Gupta, 1981
- D. pentafuscata - Gupta and Kumar, 1986
- D. pentaspina - Parshad and Duggal, 1966
- D. pentastriata - Okada, 1966
- D. percnosoma - Hardy, 1965
- D. pereirai - Takada, Momma and Shima, 1973
- D. periquito - Bächli and Vilela, 2002
- D. perissopoda - Hardy, 1965
- D. perlucida - Zhang and Liang, 1995
- D. perrisi - Wheeler and Hamilton, 1972
- D. persicae - Bock and Parsons, 1978
- D. persimilis - Dobzhansky and Epling, 1944
- D. peruensis - group Ratcov and Vilela, 2007
- D. peruensis - Wheeler, 1959
- D. peruviana - Duda, 1927
- D. petalopeza - Hardy, 1965
- D. petitae - Tsacas in Tsacas and Lachaise, 1981
- D. phaeopleura - Bock and Wheeler, 1972
- D. phalerata - Meigen, 1830
- D. phalloserra - Grimaldi & Jones, 2020
- D. phyale - Tsacas, 1981
- D. picea - Hardy, 1978
- D. pichinchana - Vela and Rafael, 2004
- D. picta - Zetterstedt, 1847
- D. picticornis - Grimshaw, 1901
- D. pictifrons - Duda, 1927
- D. pictilis - Wasserman, 1962
- D. pictura - Wasserman, 1962
- D. pihulu - Magnacca in Magnacca and Price, 2012
- D. pilacrinis - Lachaise and Chassagnard, 2002
- D. pilaresae - Vela and Rafael, 2001
- D. pilatisetae - Hardy and Kaneshiro, 1968
- D. pilimana - Grimshaw, 1901
- D. pilipa - Magnacca in Magnacca and Price, 2012
- D. pilocornuta - Lachaise and Chassagnard, 2001
- D. pilosa - Watabe and Peng, 1991
- D. pinicola - Sturtevant, 1942
- D. pinnitarsus - Bock, 1976
- D. piratininga - Ratcov and Vilela, 2007
- D. pisonia - Hardy and Kaneshiro, 1971
- D. pittieri - Bächli and Vilela, 2002
- D. plagiata - Bezzi, 1908
- D. planitibia - ardy, 1966
- D. platitarsus - Frota-Pessoa, 1954
- D. plumosa - Grimshaw, 1901
- D. podocarpus - Penafiel and Rafael, 2019
- D. pohaka - Magnacca and O'Grady, 2008
- D. poinari - Grimaldi, 1987
- D. polita - Grimshaw, 1901
- D. polliciforma - Hardy, 1965
- D. pollinospadix - Patterson and Mainland, 1944
- D. polychaeta - Patterson and Wheeler, 1942
- D. polymorpha - Dobzhansky and Pavan, 1943
- D. ponderosa - Patterson and Mainland in Patterson, 1943
- D. ponera - Tsacas and David, 1975
- D. poonia - Magnacca and O'Grady, 2008
- D. popayan - Vilela and Bächli, 2004
- D. populi - Wheeler and Throckmorton, 1961
- D. potamophila - Toda and Peng, 1989
- D. praesutilis - Hardy, 1965
- D. prashadi - Brunetti, 1923
- D. preapicula - Hardy, 1965
- D. pretiosa - Hardy, 1965
- D. primaeva - Hardy and Kaneshiro, 1968
- D. procardinoides - Frydenberg, 1956
- D. proceriseta - Hardy, 1965
- D. prodispar - Parsons and Bock in Bock, 1982
- D. prodita - Hardy, 1965
- D. progastor - Bock, 1976
- D. prolaticilia - Hardy, 1965
- D. prolixa - Hardy, 1965
- D. prolongata - Singh and Gupta, 1978
- D. promeridiana - Wasserman, 1962
- D. prominens - Hardy, 1965
- D. propachuca - Wasserman, 1962
- D. propiofacies - Hardy, 1965
- D. prorepleta - Duda, 1925
- D. prosaltans - Duda, 1927
- D. prosimilis - Duda, 1927
- D. prostipennis - Lin in Bock and Wheeler, 1972
- D. prostopalpis - Hardy and Kaneshiro, 1968
- D. pruinifacies - Frota-Pessoa, 1954
- D. pruinosa - Duda, 1940
- D. pseudoananassae - Bock, 1971
- D. pseudoargentostriata - Wheeler, 1981
- D. pseudobaimaii - Takada, Momma and Shima, 1973
- D. pseudobocainensis - Wheeler and Magalhaes, 1962
- D. pseudodenticulata - Takada and Momma, 1975
- D. pseudomayri - Baimai, 1970
- D. pseudoobscura - Frolova in Frolova and Astaurov, 1929
- D. pseudorepleta - Vilela and Bächli, 1990
- D. pseudosaltans - Magalhaes, 1956
- D. pseudosordidula - Kaneko, Tokumitsu and Takada, 1964
- D. pseudotakahashii - Mather, 1957
- D. pseudotalamancana - Pereira and Vilela, 1987
- D. pseudotetrachaeta - Angus, 1967
- D. psilophallus - Hardy and Kaneshiro, 1971
- D. psilotarsalis - Hardy and Kaneshiro, 1975
- D. pterocelis - Tsacas and Chassagnard, 1999
- D. puberula - Katoh and Gao, in Katoh et al., 2018
- D. pugyu - Vela and Rafael, 2005
- D. pulaua - Wheeler in Wilson et al., 1969
- D. pulchella - Sturtevant, 1916
- D. pulchrella - Tan, Hsu and Sheng, 1949
- D. pullata - Tan, Hsu and Sheng, 1949
- D. pullipes - Hardy and Kaneshiro, 1972
- D. pulverea - Duda, 1927
- D. punalua - Bryan, 1934
- D. punctatipennis - Tsacas and David, 1975
- D. punctatonervosa - Frey, 1954
- D. punjabiensis - Parshad and Paika, 1964
- D. purpurea - Gupta and Sundaran, 1990
- D. putrida - Sturtevant, 1916
- D. pychnochaetae - Hardy, 1965
- D. pyo - Toda, 1991

== Q ==
- D. qiongzhouensis - Katoh and Gao, in Katoh et al., 2018
- D. quadrangula - Gao & Toda, in Gao, Tanabe & Toda, 2009
- D. quadraria - Bock and Wheeler, 1972
- D. quadrilineata - de Meijere, 1911
- D. quadriseriata - Duda, 1924
- D. quadriserrata - Okada and Carson, 1982
- D. quadrisetae - Hardy, 1965
- D. quadrisetata - Takada, Beppu and Toda, 1979
- D. quadrum - (Wiedemann, 1830)
- D. quasianomalipes - Hardy, 1965
- D. quasiexpansa - Hardy, 1965
- D. quatrou - Tsacas, 1980
- D. querubimae - Vilela, 1983
- D. quijos - Guillin and Rafael, 2015
- D. quillu - Vela and Rafael, 2005
- D. quinaria - Loew, 1866
- D. quinarensis - Penafiel and Rafael, 2018
- D. quinqueannulata - Frey, 1917
- D. quinqueramosa - Hardy and Kaneshiro in Hardy et al., 2001
- D. quinquestriata - Lin and Wheeler in Lin and Tseng, 1973
- D. quitensis - Vela and Rafael, 2004

== R ==
- D. racemova - Patterson and Mainland, 1944
- D. ramamensis - Dwivedi, 1979
- D. ramsdeni - Sturtevant, 1916
- D. ranchograndensis - Bächli and Vilela, 2002
- D. reaumurii - Dufour, 1845
- D. recens - Wheeler, 1960
- D. rectangularis - Sturtevant, 1942
- D. recticilia - Hardy and Kaneshiro, 1968
- D. redunca - Hardy, 1965
- D. rellima - Wheeler, 1960
- D. repleta - Wollaston, 1858
- D. repletoides - Hsu, 1943
- D. reschae - Hardy and Kaneshiro, 1975
- D. residua - Hardy, 1965
- D. reticulata - Wheeler, 1957
- D. retnasabapathyi - Takada and Momma, 1975
- D. retrusa - Hardy, 1965
- D. reynoldsiae - Hardy and Kaneshiro, 1972
- D. rhombura - Okada and Carson, 1983
- D. rhopaloa - Bock and Wheeler, 1972
- D. richardsoni - Vilela, 1983
- D. rinjaniensis - Suwito and Watabe, in Suwito, Watabe and Toda, 2013
- D. ritae - Patterson and Wheeler, 1942
- D. robusta - Sturtevant, 1916
- D. roehrae - Pipkin and Heed, 1964
- D. rosinae - Vilela, 1983
- D. rostrata - Duda, 1925
- D. ruberrima - de Meijere, 1911
- D. ruberrimoides - Zhang and Gan, 1986
- D. rubida - Mather, 1960
- D. rubidifrons - Patterson and Mainland, 1944
- D. rubra - Sturtevant, 1927
- D. rubrifrons - Patterson and Wheeler, 1942
- D. rucux - Cespedes and Rafael, 2012
- D. rufa - Kikkawa and Peng, 1938
- D. ruizi - Ruiz-Fiegalan, 2004
- D. ruminahuii - Vela and Rafael, 2004
- D. rumipamba - Vela and Rafael, 2005
- D. runduloma - Vela and Rafael, 2005
- D. rustica - Hardy, 1965

== S ==
- D. sabroskyi - Hardy, 1965
- D. sachapuyu - Penafiel and Rafael, 2018
- D. sadleria - Bryan, 1938
- D. sahyadrii - Prakash and Reddy, 1979
- D. salpina - Chen, 1994
- D. saltans - Sturtevant, 1916
- D. sampa - Ratcov and Vilela, 2007
- D. sampagensis - Muniyappa and Reddy, 1980
- D. sannio - Gornostayev, 1991
- D. santomea - Lachaise and Harry in Lachaise et al., 2000
- D. saraguru - Penafiel and Rafael, 2019
- D. saraswati - Singh and Dash, 1998
- D. sargakhetensis - Joshi, Fartyal and Singh, 2005
- D. scaptomyzoptera - Duda, 1935
- D. schachti - Bächli, Vilela and Haring, 2002
- D. schildi - Malloch, 1924
- D. schineri - Pereira and Vilela, 1987
- D. schmidti - Duda, 1924
- D. schugi - McEvey and Schiffer, 2015
- D. scioptera - Duda, 1927
- D. scitula - Hardy, 1966
- D. scolostoma - Hardy, 1965
- D. scopata - Bock, 1976
- D. sechellia - Tsacas and Bächli, 1981
- D. seclusa - Hardy, 1965
- D. secunda - Maca, 1992
- D. seguyi - Smart, 1945
- D. seguyiana - Chassagnard and Tsacas in Chassagnard et al., 1997
- D. sejuncta - Hardy and Kaneshiro, 1968
- D. semialba - Duda, 1925
- D. semiatra - de Meijere, 1914
- D. semifuscata - Hardy, 1965
- D. seminole - Sturtevant and Dobzhansky, 1936
- D. semipruinosa - Tsacas, 2002
- D. senei - Vilela, 1983
- D. senilis - Duda, 1926
- D. senticosa - Zhang and Shi in Zhang, Toda and Watabe, 1995
- D. seorsa - Hardy, 1965
- D. septacoila - Gai and Krishnamurthy, 1984
- D. septentriosaltans - Magalhaes and Buck in Magalhaes, 1962
- D. serenensis - Brncic, 1957
- D. serido - Vilela and Sene, 1977
- D. seriema - Tidon-Sklorz and Sene, 1995
- D. serrata - Malloch, 1927
- D. serripaenula - Okada and Carson, 1982
- D. serrula - Tsacas, 1984
- D. serrulata - Zhang and Toda in Zhang, Toda and Watabe, 1995
- D. setapex - Patterson and Mainland, 1944
- D. setifemur - Malloch, 1924
- D. setiger - Grimshaw, 1901
- D. setipalpus - Hardy, 1965
- D. setitarsa - Gupta and Dwivedi, 1980
- D. setosifrons - Hardy and Kaneshiro, 1968
- D. setosimentum - Hardy and Kaneshiro, 1968
- D. setositibia - Hardy and Kaneshiro in Hardy et al., 2001
- D. setula - Heed and Wheeler, 1957
- D. sevensteri - Grimaldi, 2016
- D. sexlineata - Duda, 1940
- D. seyanii - Chassagnard and Tsacas in Chassagnard et al., 1997
- D. sharpi - Grimshaw, 1901
- D. shi - Zhang, 2000
- D. shuyu - Vela and Rafael, 2005
- D. shwezayana - Toda, 1986
- D. shyri - Vela and Rafael, 2004
- D. siamana - Hihara and Lin, 1984
- D. siamana - Ikeda et al., 1983
- D. siangensis - Kumar and Gupta, 1988
- D. sierrae - Ruiz-Fiegalan, 2003
- D. sigmoides - Loew, 1872
- D. signata - (Duda, 1923)
- D. sikkimensis - Gupta and Gupta, 1991
- D. silvarentis - Hardy and Kaneshiro, 1968
- D. silvata - de Meijere, 1916
- D. silvestris - erkins, 1910
- D. similis - Williston, 1896
- D. simulans - Sturtevant, 1919
- D. simulivora - Tsacas and Disney, 1974
- D. sinobscura - Watabe in Watabe et al., 1996
- D. sinuata - Bock, 1982
- D. sisa - Vela and Rafael, 2005
- D. sisapamba - Figuero, Leon, Rafael and Cespedes, 2012
- D. smithersi - Bock, 1976
- D. sobrina - Hardy and Kaneshiro, 1971
- D. sodomae - Hardy and Kaneshiro, 1968
- D. sogo - Burla, 1954
- D. solennis - Walker, 1860
- D. solstitialis - Chen, 1994
- D. sonorae - Heed and Castrezana, 2008
- D. soonae - Takada and Yoon, 1989
- D. sordidapex - Grimshaw, 1901
- D. sordidula - Kikkawa and Peng, 1938
- D. spadicifrons - Patterson and Mainland, 1944
- D. spaniothrix - Hardy and Kaneshiro, 1968
- D. speciosa - da Silva and Martins, 2004
- D. spectabilis - Hardy, 1965
- D. spenceri - Patterson, 1943
- D. sphaerocera - Thomson, 1869
- D. spicula - Hardy, 1965
- D. spiethi - Hardy, 1966
- D. spinatermina - Heed and Wheeler, 1957
- D. spinula - Okada and Carson, 1982
- D. sproati - Hardy and Kaneshiro, 1968
- D. spuricurviceps - Zhang and Gan, 1986
- D. stalkeri - Wheeler, 1954
- D. starki - Grimaldi, 2016
- D. starmeri - Wasserman, Koepfer and Ward, 1973
- D. statzi - Ashburner and Bächli, 2004
- D. stenoptera - Hardy, 1965
- D. stenotrichala - Lachaise and Chassagnard, 2002
- D. stephanosi - Tsacas, 2003
- D. sternopleuralis - Okada and Kurokawa, 1957
- D. sticta - Wheeler, 1957
- D. stictoptera - Tsacas and Chassagnard, 1999
- D. stigma - Hardy, 1977
- D. straubae - Heed and Grimaldi, 1991
- D. strigiventris - Duda, 1927
- D. sturtevanti - Duda, 1927
- D. stylipennis - Grimaldi, 2016
- D. subarctica - Hackman, 1969
- D. subauraria - Kimura, 1983
- D. subbadia - Patterson and Mainland in Patterson, 1943
- D. subelegans - Okada, 1988
- D. subfasciata - de Meijere, 1914
- D. subfunebris - Stalker and Spencer, 1939
- D. subinfumata - Duda, 1925
- D. submacroptera - Patterson and Mainland in Patterson, 1943
- D. subobscura - Collin in Gordon, 1936
- D. suboccidentalis - Spencer, 1942
- D. subopaca - Hardy and Kaneshiro in Hardy et al., 2001
- D. suborosa - Kumar and Gupta, 1992
- D. subpalustris - Spencer, 1942
- D. subpulchrella - Takamori and Watabe in Takamori, Watabe, Fuyama, Zhang and Aotsuka, 2006
- D. subsaltans - Magalhaes, 1956
- D. subsilvestris - Hardy & Kaneshiro, 1968
- D. substenoptera - Hardy, 1969
- D. subviridis - Patterson and Mainland in Patterson, 1943
- D. succini - Grimaldi, 1987
- D. sucinea - Patterson and Mainland, 1944
- D. suffusca - Spencer in Patterson, 1943
- D. sui - Lin and Tseng, 1973
- D. sulfurigaster - (Duda, 1923)
- D. sundaensis - Suwito and Watabe, in Suwito, Watabe and Toda, 2013
- D. suni - Vela and Rafael, 2005
- D. surangensis - Singh, Dash and Fartyal, 2004
- D. surucucho - Vela and Rafael, 2005
- D. suturalis - Wheeler, 1957
- D. suzukii - (Matsumura, 1931)
- D. swezeyi - Hardy, 1965
- D. sycophaga - Tsacas in Tsacas and Lachaise, 1981
- D. sycophila - Tsacas in Tsacas and Lachaise, 1981
- D. sycovora - Tsacas in Tsacas and Lachaise, 1981
- D. synpanishi - Okada, 1964
- D. systenopeza - Hardy and Kaneshiro, 1979

== T ==
- D. taekjuni - Kim and Joo, 2002
- D. taeniata - Hardy, 1965
- D. taiensis - Kumar and Gupta, 1988
- D. taipinsanensis - Lin and Tseng, 1973
- D. takahashii - Sturtevant, 1927
- D. talamancana - Wheeler, 1968
- D. talasica - Gornostayev, 1991
- D. tamashiroi - Hardy, 1965
- D. tani - Cheng and Okada, 1985
- D. tanorum - Okada, 1964
- D. tanytarsis - Hardy and Kaneshiro in Hardy et al., 2001
- D. tanythrix - Hardy, 1965
- D. taractica - Hardy, 1965
- D. tarphytrichia - Hardy, 1965
- D. tarsalis - Walker, 1852
- D. tarsata - Schiner, 1868
- D. taxohuaycu - Vela and Rafael, 2005
- D. teissieri - Tsacas, 1971
- D. tendomentum - Hardy, 1965
- D. tenebrosa - Spencer in Patterson, 1943
- D. tenuipes - (Walker, 1849)
- D. teratos - Bock, 1982
- D. teresae - Pradhan and Sati, in Pradhan et al., 2015
- D. testacea - von Roser, 1840
- D. testacens - Wheeler, 1981
- D. tetrachaeta - Angus, 1964
- D. tetradentata - Singh and Gupta, 1981
- D. tetraspilota - Hardy, 1965
- D. tetravittata - Takada and Momma, 1975
- D. thienemanni - Duda, 1931
- D. thurstoni - Grimaldi, 2016
- D. tibialis - Wheeler, 1957
- D. tibudu - Burla, 1954
- D. tjibodas - de Meijere, 1916
- D. tolteca - Patterson and Mainland, 1944
- D. tomasi - Vela and Rafael, 2001
- D. tongpua - Lin and Tseng, 1973
- D. torquata - Zhang and Toda in Zhang, Toda and Watabe, 1995
- D. torrei - Sturtevant, 1921
- D. torula - Hardy, 1965
- D. totonigra - Hardy, 1965
- D. touchardiae - Hardy and Kaneshiro, 1972
- D. toxacantha - Magnacca and O'Grady, 2009
- D. toxochaeta - Perreira and Kaneshiro, 1991
- D. toyohii - Lin and Tseng, 1972
- D. tranquilla - Spencer in Patterson, 1943
- D. transfuga - Hardy, 1965
- D. transversa - Fallen, 1823
- D. trapeza - Heed and Wheeler, 1957
- D. trapezifrons - Okada, 1966
- D. triangula - Wheeler, 1949
- D. triangulina - Duda, 1927
- D. triantilia - Okada, 1988
- D. triauraria - Bock and Wheeler, 1972
- D. trichaeta - Angus, 1967
- D. trichaetosa - Hardy, 1965
- D. trichala - Lachaise and Chassagnard, 2002
- D. trichiaspis - Duda, 1940
- D. tricombata - Singh and Gupta, 1977
- D. trifiloides - Wheeler, 1957
- D. trifilum - Frota-Pessoa, 1954
- D. trilimbata - Bezzi, 1928
- D. trilutea - Bock and Wheeler, 1972
- D. tripunctata - Loew, 1862
- D. trisetosa - Okada, 1966
- D. trispina - Wheeler, 1949
- D. tristani - Sturtevant, 1921
- D. tristipennis - Duda, 1924
- D. tristipes - Duda, 1924
- D. tristis - Fallen, 1823
- D. tristriata - Heed and Wheeler, 1957
- D. trizonata - Okada, 1966
- D. tropicalis - Burla and da Cunha in Burla et al., 1949
- D. truncata - Okada, 1964
- D. truncipenna - Hardy, 1965
- D. tsacasi - Bock and Wheeler, 1972
- D. tsachila - Llangari & Rafael, 2020
- D. tschirnhausi - Bächli and Vilela, 2002
- D. tsigana - Burla and Gloor, 1952
- D. tsukubaensis - Takamori and Okada, 1983
- D. tuchaua - Pavan, 1950
- D. tucumana - Vilela and Pereira, 1985
- D. turbata - Hardy and Kaneshiro, 1969
- D. tychaea - Tsacas in Tsacas and Lachaise, 1981

== U ==
- D. umiumi - Magnacca and O'Grady, 2009
- D. ungarensis - de Meijere, 1911
- D. unguicula - Okada and Carson, 1983
- D. unicolor - (Walker, 1864)
- D. unicula - Hardy, 1965
- D. unimaculata - Strobl, 1893
- D. uninubes - Patterson and Mainland in Patterson, 1943
- D. unipectinata - Duda, 1924
- D. unipunctata - Patterson and Mainland in Patterson, 1943
- D. uniseriata - Hardy and Kaneshiro, 1968
- D. uniseta - Wasserman, Koepfer and Ward, 1973
- D. unispina - Okada, 1956
- D. upoluae - Malloch, 1934
- D. urcu - Vela and Rafael, 2005
- D. urubamba - Vilela and Pereira, 1993
- D. ustulata - de Meijere, 1908

== V ==
- D. valenciai - Vela and Rafael, 2001
- D. vallismaia - Tsacas, 1984
- D. vanderlindei - Ruiz-Fiegalan, 2004
- D. varga - Hardy, 1965
- D. variabilis - Hardy, 1965
- D. varians - Bock and Wheeler, 1972
- D. varipennis - Grimshaw, 1901
- D. velascoi - Ruiz-Fiegalan, 2003
- D. velata - Hardy, 1965
- D. velox - Watabe and Peng, 1991
- D. velutinifrons - Hardy, 1965
- D. venezolana - Wasserman, Fontdevila, and Ruiz, 1983
- D. venusta - Hardy, 1965
- D. verbesinae - Figuero, Leon, Rafael and Cespedes, 2012
- D. verticis - Williston, 1896
- D. vesciseta - Hardy and Kaneshiro, 1968
- D. vicentinae - Vilela, 1983
- D. villitibia - Hardy, 1965
- D. villosa - Hardy, 1965
- D. villosipedis - Hardy, 1965
- D. vinnula - Hardy, 1965
- D. viracochi - Brncic and Koref-Santibanez, 1957
- D. vireni - Bächli, Vilela and Haring, 2002
- D. virgulata - Hardy and Kaneshiro, 1968
- D. virilis - Sturtevant, 1916
- D. vulcana - Graber, 1957
- D. vumbae - Bock and Wheeler, 1972

== W ==
- D. wachi - Penafiel and Rafael, 2019
- D. waddingtoni - Basden, 1976
- D. wahihuna - Magnacca and O'Grady, 2009
- D. waikamoi - Magnacca and O'Grady, 2009
- D. wangi - Toda and Zhang in Zhang, Toda and Watabe, 1995
- D. warmi - Penafiel and Rafael, 2019
- D. wassermani - Pitnick and Heed, 1994
- D. watanabei - Gupta and Gupta, 1992
- D. wauana - Okada and Carson, 1982
- D. wawae - Magnacca and O'Grady, 2009
- D. wayta - Figuero, Leon, Rafael and Cespedes, 2012
- D. whartonae - Pipkin and Heed, 1964
- D. wheeleri - Patterson and Alexander, 1952
- D. wikani - Magnacca and O'Grady, 2009
- D. wikstroemiae - Magnacca and O'Grady, 2009
- D. williamsi - Hardy, 1965
- D. willistoni - Sturtevant, 1916
- D. wingei - Cordeiro, 1964

== X ==
- D. xalapa - Vilela and Bächli, 2004
- D. xanthia - Tsacas, 1981
- D. xanthochroa - Tsacas, 2001
- D. xanthogaster - Duda, 1924
- D. xanthognoma - Hardy, 1965
- D. xanthopallescens - Pipkin, 1964
- D. xanthosoma - Grimshaw, 1901
- D. xenophagaa - Kam and Pereira in O'Grady et al., 2003
- D. xerophila - Val in Carson et al., 1983
- D. xiphiphora - Pipkin, 1964
- D. xuthoptera - Hardy, 1965

== Y ==
- D. yakuba - Burla, 1954
- D. yambe - Cabezas, Llangari and Rafael, 2015
- D. yana - Vela and Rafael, 2005
- D. yanaurcus - Figuero, Rafael and Cespedes, 2012
- D. yanayuyu - Cespedes and Rafael, 2012
- D. yangana - Rafael and Vela, 2003
- D. yooni - Hardy, 1977
- D. yunnanensis - Watabe and Liang in Watabe et al., 1990
- D. yurag - Figuero and Rafael, 2011
- D. yuragshina - Figuero and Rafael, 2011
- D. yuragyacum - Figuero, Rafael and Cespedes, 2012
- D. yuwanensis - Kim and Okada, 1988

== Z ==
- D. z-notata - Bryan, 1934
- D. zamorana - Penafiel and Rafael, 2018
- D. zonata - Chen and Watabe, 1993
- D. zophea - Tsacas, 2004
- D. zottii - Vilela, 1983
