= D. carbonaria =

D. carbonaria may refer to:

- Dactylolabis carbonaria, a crane fly species in the genus Dactylolabis
- Diglossa carbonaria, the grey-bellied flowerpiercer, a bird species found in Argentina and Bolivia
- Drosophila carbonaria, a fly species in the genus Drosophila

== See also ==
- Carbonaria (disambiguation)
