= Microbiome in the Drosophila gut =

Microorganisms living in the fruit fly

The microbiota are the sum of all symbiotic microorganisms (mutualistic, commensal or pathogenic) living on or in an organism. The fruit fly Drosophila melanogaster is a model organism and known as one of the most investigated organisms worldwide. The microbiota in flies is less complex than that found in humans. It still has an influence on the fitness of the fly, and it affects different life-history characteristics such as lifespan (life expectancy), resistance against pathogens (immunity) and metabolic processes (digestion). Considering the comprehensive toolkit available for research in Drosophila, analysis of its microbiome could enhance our understanding of similar processes in other types of host-microbiota interactions, including those involving humans. Microbiota plays key roles in the intestinal immune and metabolic responses via their fermentation product (short chain fatty acid), acetate.

== Microbial composition ==
Drosophila melanogaster possesses a comparatively simple gut microbiota, consisting of only few bacterial species, mainly from two bacterial taxonomic groups: Bacillota and Pseudomonadota. The most common species belong to the families Lactobacillaceae (abundance of approx. 30%, members of the Bacillota) and Acetobacteraceae (approx. 55%, members of the Proteobacteria). Other less common bacterial species are from the families Leuconostocaceae, Enterococaceae, and Enterobacteriaceae (all with an abundance in between 2–4%). The most common species include Lactobacillus plantarum, Lactobacillus brevis, Acetobacter pomorum and Enterococcus faecalis, while other species such as Acetobacter aceti, Acetobacter tropicalis and Acetobacter pasteurianus are also often found.

The particular species of the host fly has a central influence on the composition and quality of the gut microbiota, even if flies are raised under similar conditions. Nevertheless, the host's diet and nutritional environment also shape the exact composition of the microbiota. For instance the exact pH of the food can kill certain bacterial species. In general, the type of food used by the fly affects the microbiota composition. Mushroom feeder species like Drosophila falleni and Microdrosophila harbour many Lactobacillales and generally maintain high bacterial diversity in their guts. The microbiota of flower feeders such as Drosophila elegans and Drosophila flavohirta shows higher abundance of Enterobacteriaceae and to a lesser extent of acido-philic bacteria (such as Acetobacteraceae and Lactobacillaceae) if compared to fruit-eating species such as Drosophila hydei, Drosophila immigrans, Drosophila sulfurigaster, Drosophila melanogaster, Drosophila sechellia or Drosophila takahashii. The microbial load and bacterial composition also vary with the age of the host fly.

== Microbiota transmission and establishment ==
Feeding is a key determinant of the microbiota composition. Not only the diet influences presence and abundance of the bacteria inside the gut, but the bacteria also need to be taken up continuously from the environment to prevail as members of the intestinal flora. Feeding on feces seems to play a central role for establishment of the Drosophila microbiota, as it allows the flies to recycle the bacteria within a fly population at a particular time point and also across generations. Flies seed the embryonic eggshell with feces. Upon hatching, young larvae eat their eggshells and thereby pick up the bacteria. The microbiota, which subsequently establishes itself inside the gut of the developing larvae, is similar to that of the larvae's mothers. This may further be promoted by the particular life history of the flies. Young adult flies, which harbor fewer bacteria than old flies, proliferate in an environment shaped by the feces of the preceding fly generation, thus allowing them to take up additional bacteria.

== Gut compartmentalization ==
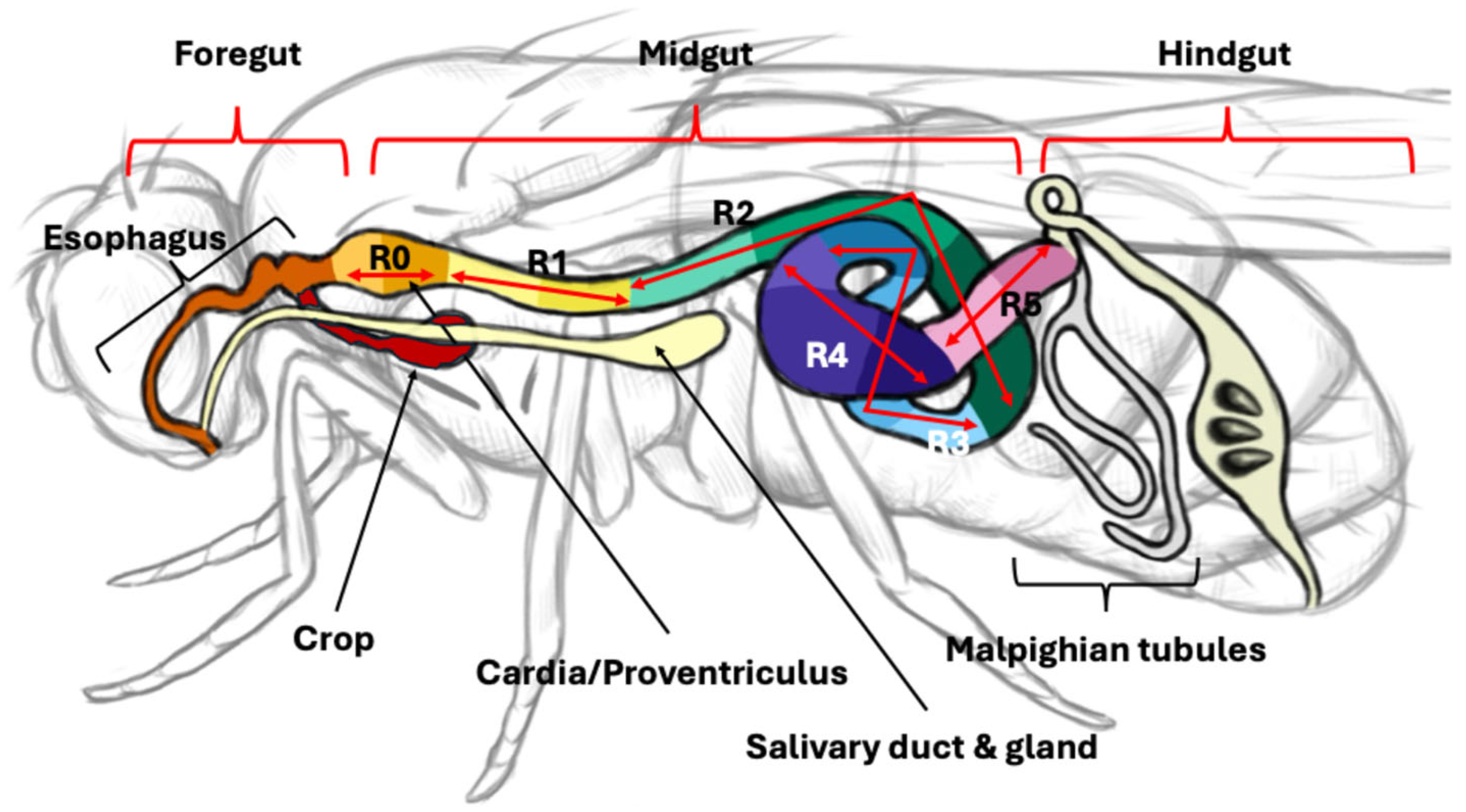
Drosophila melanogaster gut The gut is anatomically and functionally divided into three major regions: the foregut, midgut, and hindgut. The foregut includes the esophagus and crop, functioning in food storage and initial mechanical digestion. The midgut is the primary site for enzymatic digestion and nutrient absorption. The hindgut is involved in water reabsorption and waste excretion. R0–R4 indicate the further division of the midgut into five smaller regions.

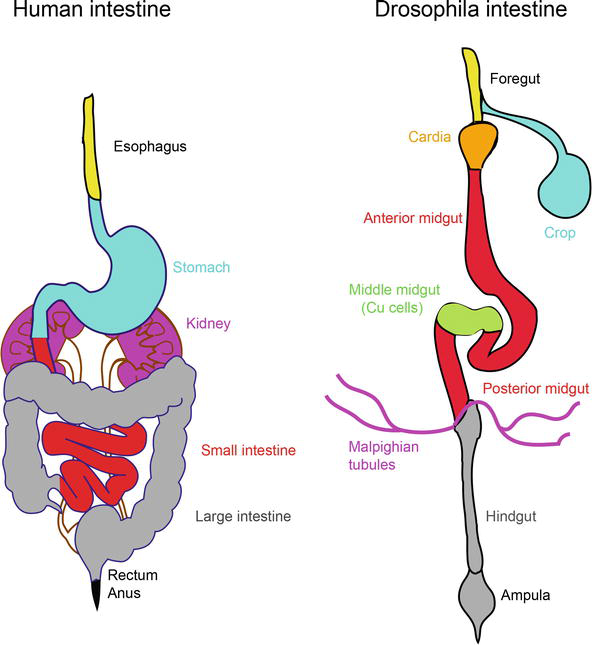
Comparison between human and Drosophila gut Organs with similar functions are coded with same colors. Drosophila contains many tissues/organs that functionally resemble to most essential human gastrointestinal system: Esophagus (foregut), midgut (small intestine) and large intestine (hindgut), stomach (crop), kidneys (malpighian tubules).

In the gut (digestive tract) of Drosophila melanogaster the composition and action of the microbiome appears to be tightly regulated within compartments, that is different sections of the intestines. This is indicated by the differential expression of genes, especially with a regulatory function, in the epithelium of different parts of the gut. In detail, the gut is compartmentalized into three parts, the foregut, the midgut, and the hindgut. While foregut and hindgut are lined with a cuticle formed by the ectodermal epithelium, the midgut is of endodermal origin. In adult flies the midgut is further divided into five smaller regions. The immune response varies among the gut regions. The immune deficiency (IMD) pathway responds to bacterial infections and is activated by certain receptors (e.g., the peptidoglycan receptor protein PGRP-LC). These receptors and also other components of the Drosophila immune system such as Toll receptor and dDUOX pathway molecules control immune responses in ectodermal tissue of the anterior gut. Moreover, the anterior midgut is enriched in certain antimicrobial peptides (AMPs). This suggests that the immune defence in this area is particularly responsive, possibly because this regions represents the first contact region for newly taken up food, microbiota, and/or intestinal pathogens. In the middle and posterior midgut, other genes such as the receptor PGRP-LB, which down-regulates the IMD immune response, are expressed, possibly in order to minimize expression of immune defence against the microbiota. In addition, the microbiota itself seems to control the expression of several Drosophila metabolic genes within the midgut, possibly to facilitate digestion of food. Recently, IMD pathway in the anterior midgut region has been proposed to play multi-pronged roles to modulate key metabolic and mechanic functions in the gut. Taken together, it appears that the interaction between host and microbiota is precisely regulated across different regions within the gut.

== Effects on behaviour ==
Drosophila microbiota have been implicated in mating success by influencing assortative mating; a phenomenon detected in some studies of Drosophila, but not others.

== Effects on longevity ==
The microbiota seem to affect the lifespan of Drosophila melanogaster. To date, the mechanisms of this effect remain elusive.
Fruit flies raised under axenic conditions (i.e., without any bacteria in the environment) or cured of their microbiota with antibiotics had a shorter lifespan than flies raised under normal conditions. The microbiota influence on longevity seems to be particularly strong early in development. To date, however, the exact mechanisms underlying these effects remain elusive. It is possible that the microbiota-induced proliferation of intestinal stem cells and associated metabolic homeostasis is important in this context. In contrast, the microbiota seems to have a negative effect on lifespan in older Drosophila melanogaster, because their removal in ageing flies increases longevity. Old flies have a reduced ability to fight infections and this may also relate to the bacterial members of the microbiota. In aged animals, immune responses may over-shoot, possibly harming the host and favoring colonization with pathogens (e.g. Gluconobacter morbifer).

== New methods of microbiome analysis ==
Almost all current approaches for the characterization of Drosophila microbiota rely on destructive approaches, that is flies are killed, their gut is extracted and from these the bacteria are isolated and/or analyzed. For an assessment of microbiota dynamics across the lifespan of an individual fly or across development of a fly population, a non-destructive approach would be favorable. Such an approach was recently developed, focusing on the microbial characterization of fly feces. Fly feces are indeed informative on composition of the gut microbiota, since the diversity of gut bacteria, feces bacteria and bacteria of whole fly of Drosophila melanogaster are all strongly correlated. This new approach could be used to demonstrate the known influence of diets.
