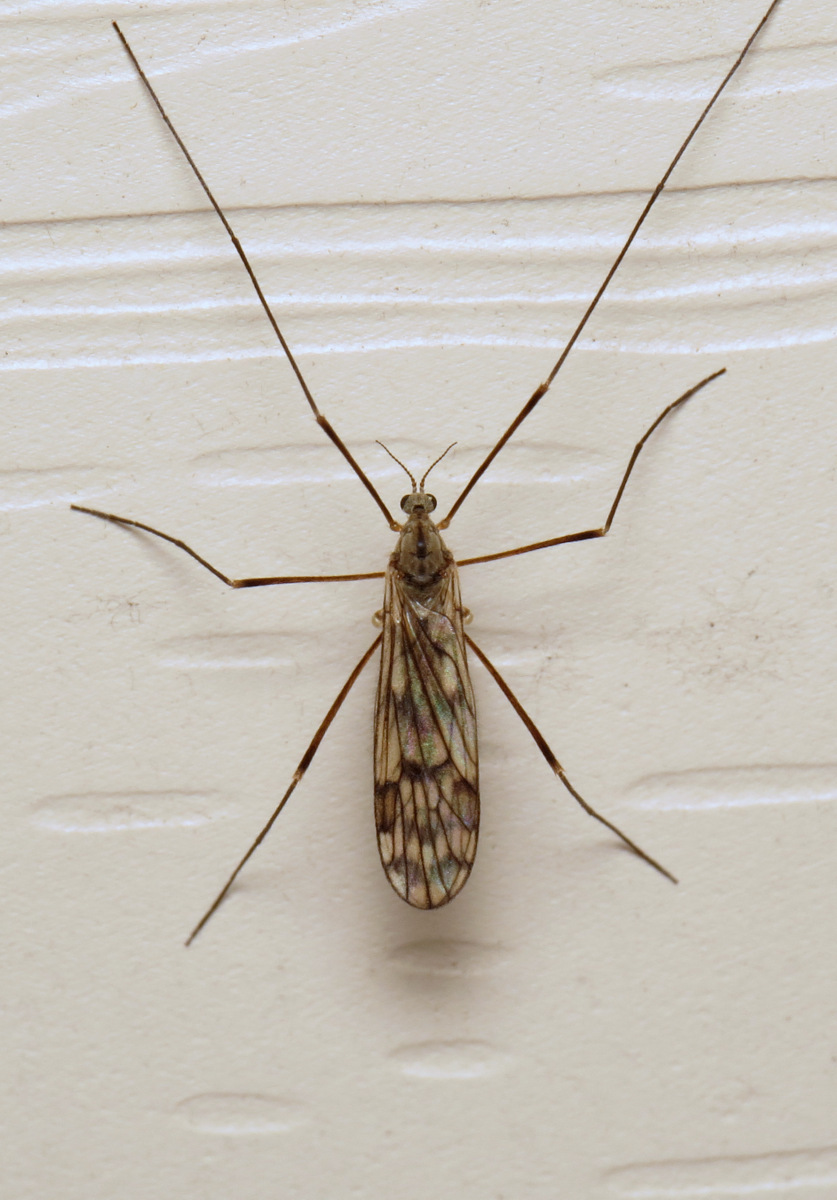

Scientific classification
- Domain: Eukaryota
- Kingdom: Animalia
- Phylum: Arthropoda
- Class: Insecta
- Order: Diptera
- Family: Limoniidae
- Genus: Dactylolabis
- Species: D. montana

Binomial name
- Dactylolabis montana Osten Sacken

Synonyms
- Limnophila montana Osten Sacken, 1859

= Dactylolabis montana =

Species of fly

Dactylolabis montana is a species of limoniid crane fly in the family Limoniidae.
