= Dactylolabis vestigipennis =

Scientific classification
- Domain: Eukaryota
- Kingdom: Animalia
- Phylum: Arthropoda
- Class: Insecta
- Order: Diptera
- Family: Limoniidae
- Genus: Dactylolabis
- Species: D. vestigipennis

Binomial name
- Dactylolabis vestigipennis Alexander, 1950

Species of fly

Dactylolabis vestigipennis is a species of limoniid crane fly in the family Limoniidae.
