= Flightless fruit fly =

Order of flies

Flightless fruit flies (Order Diptera) encompass a variety of different species of fly, such as Drosophila melanogaster, Bactrocera cucurbitae, Bactrocera dorsalis, and Drosophila hydei, with genetic mutations that cause them to be flightless. These genetic mutations may have different results such as the development of muscles that cannot support flight or even result in the lack of wings entirely. Flightless fly models have been especially useful for the study of human neuromuscular diseases such as spinal muscular atrophy, spinobulbar muscular atrophy, myotonic dystrophy, dystrophinopathies and other inherited neuromuscular diseases. Applications of flightless flies are extremely varied, even being used as test subjects in aeronautical research.

== Uses for feeding pets ==
Other applications of flightless flies include using them as convenient feeders for a variety of companion animals, usually small reptiles such as geckos, being highly versatile due to their small size. Fruit flies are a useful source of protein for captive ant colonies. They can be fed to a colony dead or alive and whilst they are best used for small colonies, fruit flies can also be given to larger ones.
