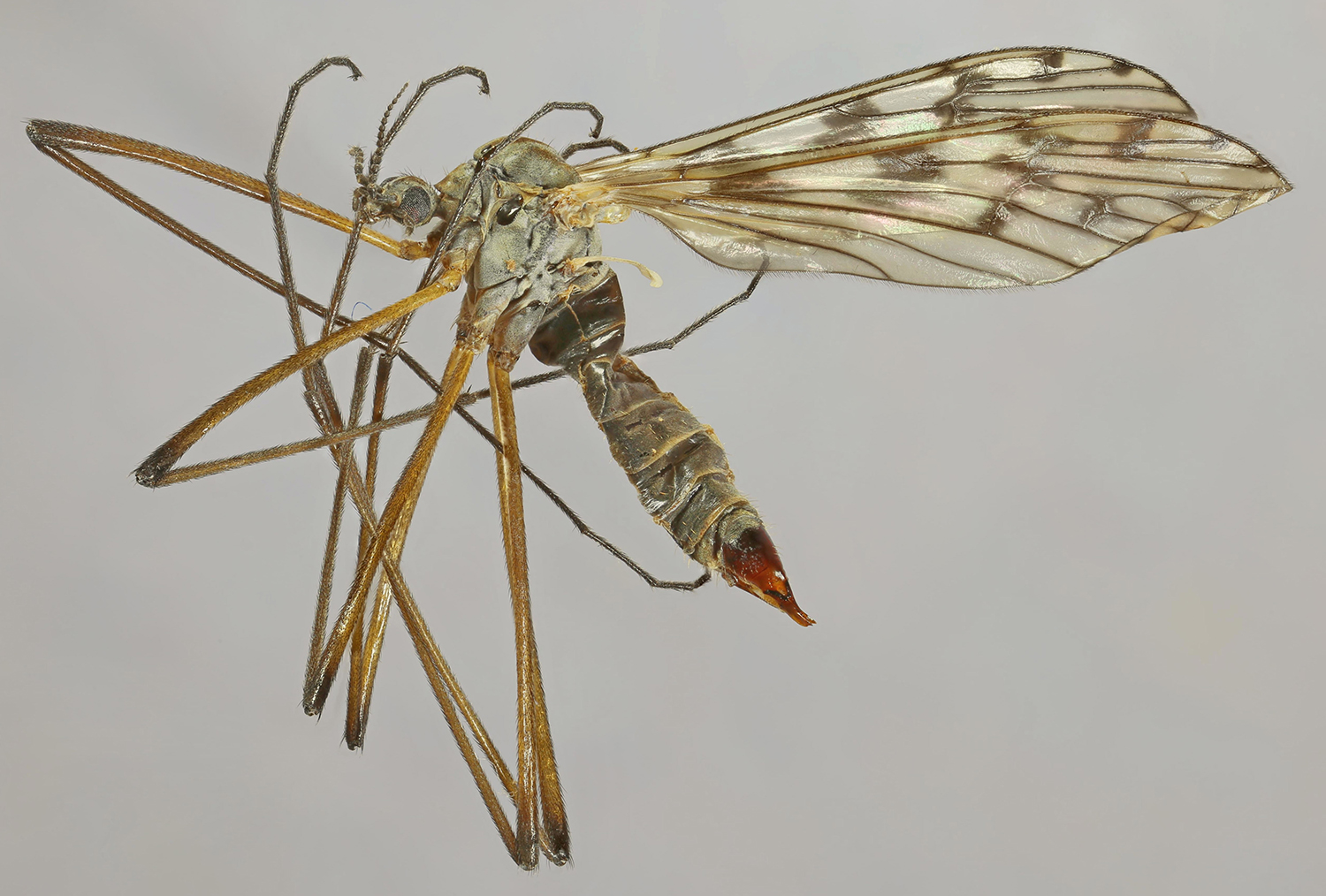
- Dactylolabis sexmaculata , North Wales

Scientific classification
- Kingdom: Animalia
- Phylum: Arthropoda
- Class: Insecta
- Order: Diptera
- Infraorder: Tipulomorpha
- Superfamily: Tipuloidea
- Family: Limoniidae
- Subfamily: Dactylolabinae
- Genus: Dactylolabis
- Species: D. sexmaculata

Binomial name
- Dactylolabis sexmaculata (Macquart, 1826)

= Dactylolabis sexmaculata =

Species of fly

Dactylolabis sexmaculata is a Palearctic species of cranefly in the family Limoniidae. It is found in a wide range of habitats and micro habitats: in earth rich in humus, in swamps and marshes, in leaf litter and in wet spots in woods.
