= Dudaica =

Scientific classification
- Domain: Eukaryota
- Kingdom: Animalia
- Phylum: Arthropoda
- Class: Insecta
- Order: Diptera
- Family: Drosophilidae
- Subfamily: Drosophilinae
- Genus: Drosophila
- Subgenus: Dudaica; Strand, 1943

Type species
- Drosophila senilis Duda, 1926

Species
- Drosophila albipalpis; Drosophila dissimilis; Drosophila gracilipalpis; Drosophila malayana; Drosophila orthophallata; Drosophila puberula; Drosophila qiongzhouensis; Drosophila senilis

Subgenus of insects

The subgenus Dudaica belongs to genus Drosophila and consists of two species, Drosophila malayana (Takada, 1976) and Drosophila senilis Duda, 1926.
