= Drosophila fasciola =

Scientific classification
- Kingdom: Animalia
- Phylum: Arthropoda
- Clade: Pancrustacea
- Class: Insecta
- Order: Diptera
- Family: Drosophilidae
- Subfamily: Drosophilinae
- Genus: Drosophila
- Subgenus: Drosophila
- Species: D. fasciola

Binomial name
- Drosophila fasciola Williston, 1896

Species of fly

Drosophila fasciola is a species of fruit fly.

== Distribution ==
Saint Vincent and the Grenadines, El Salvador, Guyana.
