= Drosophila acanthoptera =

Scientific classification
- Domain: Eukaryota
- Kingdom: Animalia
- Phylum: Arthropoda
- Class: Insecta
- Order: Diptera
- Family: Drosophilidae
- Genus: Drosophila
- Species: D. acanthoptera

Binomial name
- Drosophila acanthoptera Wheeler, 1949

Species of fly

Drosophila acanthoptera is a species of fly in the genus Drosophila, whose females seldom remate.
