= Drosophila malayana =

Scientific classification
- Kingdom: Animalia
- Phylum: Arthropoda
- Clade: Pancrustacea
- Class: Insecta
- Order: Diptera
- Family: Drosophilidae
- Subfamily: Drosophilinae
- Genus: Drosophila
- Subgenus: Dudaica
- Species: D. malayana

Binomial name
- Drosophila malayana Takada, 1976

Species of fly

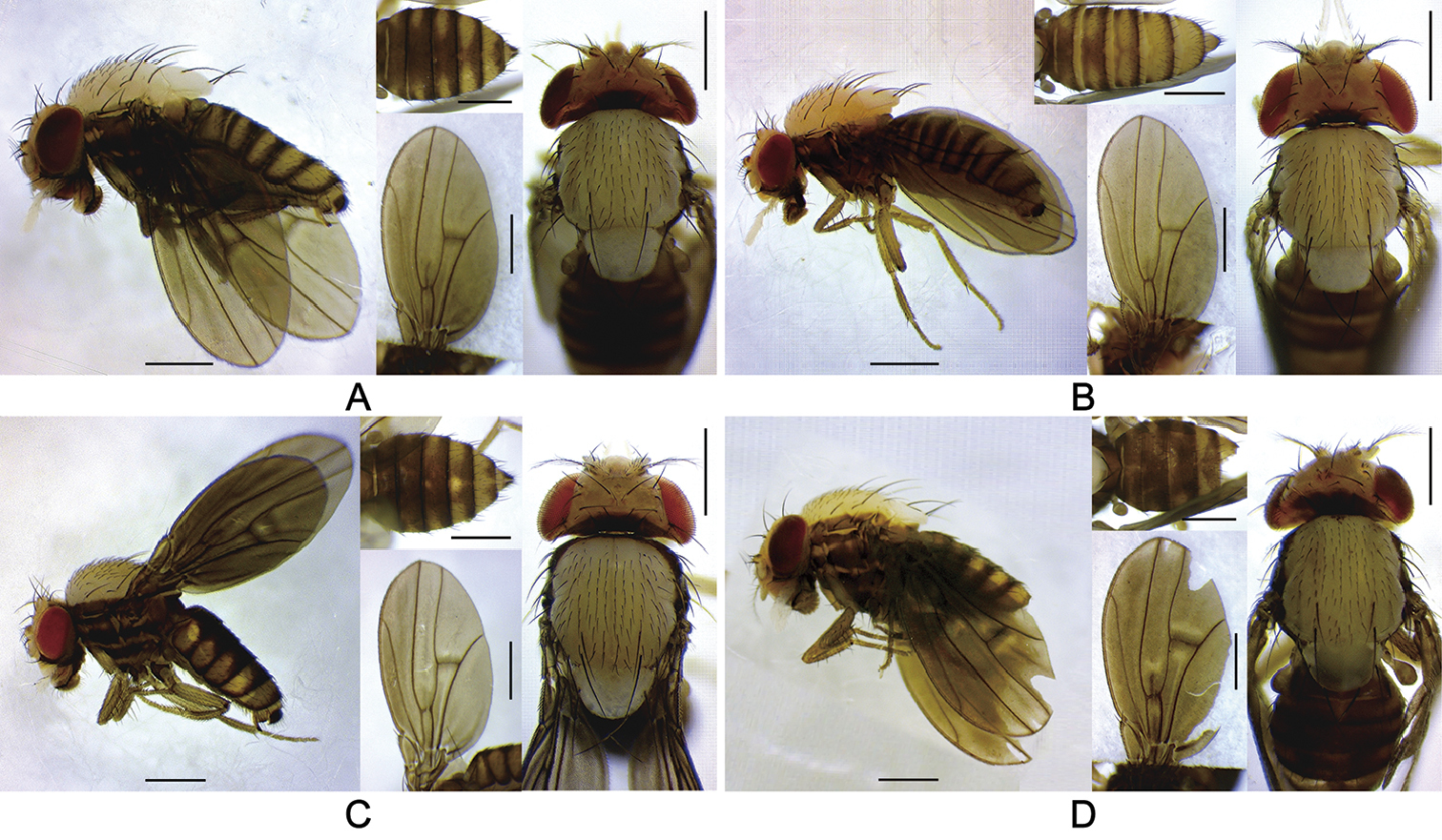
Diagram of Drosophila malayana (Part A)

Drosophila malayana is a species of fly in the subgenus Dudaica.
