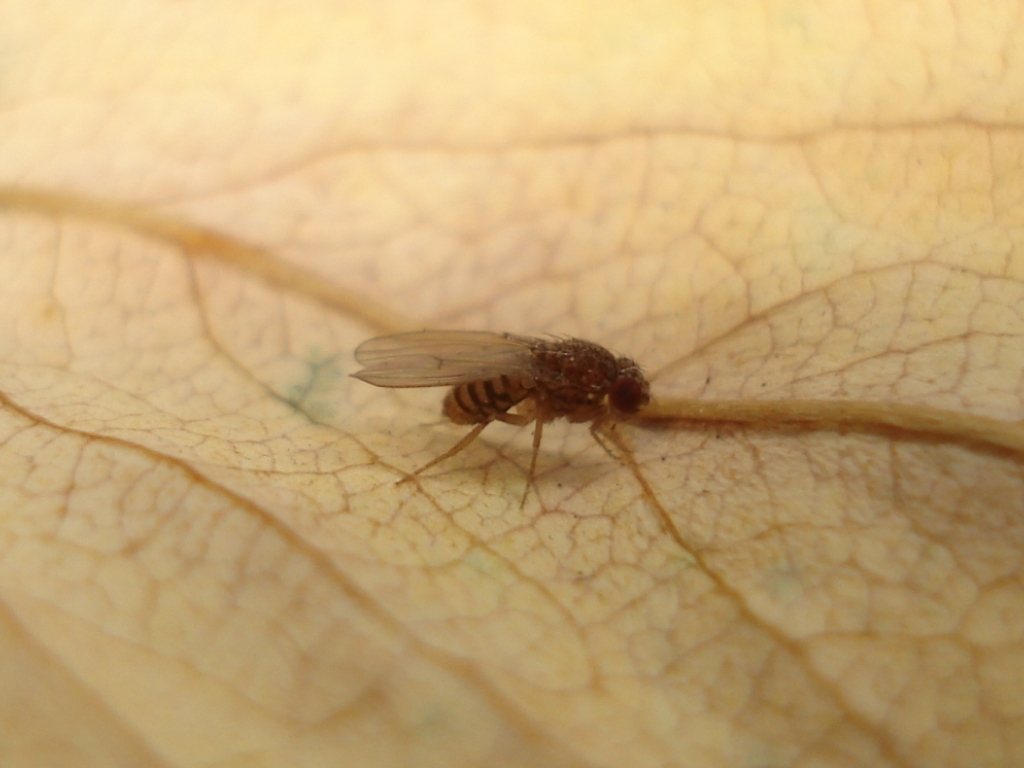

Scientific classification
- Kingdom: Animalia
- Phylum: Arthropoda
- Class: Insecta
- Order: Diptera
- Family: Drosophilidae
- Genus: Drosophila
- Species: D. meridiana

Binomial name
- Drosophila meridiana Patterson and Wheeler, 1942

= Drosophila meridiana =

Species of fly

Drosophila meridiana is a species of fruit fly that is native to North America.
