= Drosophila pseudoargentostriata =

Scientific classification
- Kingdom: Animalia
- Phylum: Arthropoda
- Class: Insecta
- Order: Diptera
- Family: Drosophilidae
- Genus: Drosophila
- Species: D. pseudoargentostriata

Binomial name
- Drosophila pseudoargentostriata Wheeler, 1981

Species of fly

Drosophila pseudoargentostriata is a species of fruit fly in the genus Drosophila, described by Wheeler in 1981.
