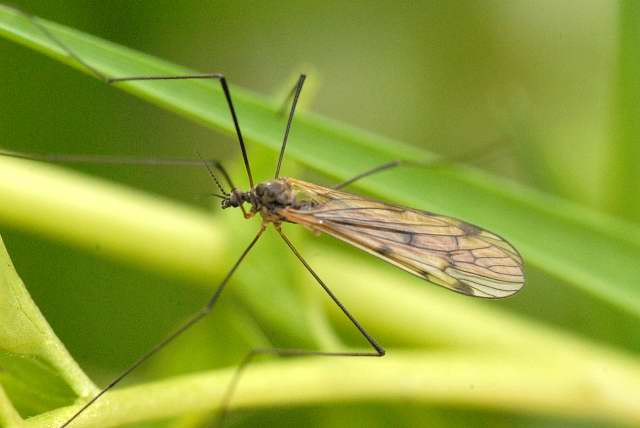
- Dactylolabis transversa

Scientific classification
- Domain: Eukaryota
- Kingdom: Animalia
- Phylum: Arthropoda
- Class: Insecta
- Order: Diptera
- Infraorder: Tipulomorpha
- Superfamily: Tipuloidea
- Family: Limoniidae
- Subfamily: Dactylolabinae
- Genus: Dactylolabis; Osten Sacken, 1860

Type species
- Limnophila montana Osten Sacken, 1860, 1860

Subgenera
- Bothrophorus Savchenko, 1984; Coenolabis Savchenko, 1969; Dactylolabis Osten Sacken, 1860; Eudactylolabis Alexander, 1950

= Dactylolabis =

Genus of flies

Dactylolabis is a genus of crane flies in the family Limoniidae. It is placed in its own subfamily, Dactylolabinae. Dactylolabis contains the following species:

Subgenus Bothrophorus Savchenko, 1984
Dactylolabis monstrosa (Savchenko, 1971)
Subgenus Coenolabis Savchenko, 1969
Dactylolabis aberrans Savchenko, 1963
Dactylolabis posthabita (Bergroth, 1888)
Subgenus Dactylolabis Osten Sacken, 1860

Dactylolabis adventitia Alexander, 1942
Dactylolabis anomala (Kuntze, 1913)
Dactylolabis carbonaria Savchenko, 1972
Dactylolabis cingulata Savchenko, 1978
Dactylolabis confinis Lackschewitz, 1940
Dactylolabis corsicana Edwards, 1928
Dactylolabis cubitalis (Osten Sacken, 1869)
Dactylolabis degradans Savchenko, 1978
Dactylolabis denticulata (Bergroth, 1891)
Dactylolabis dilatata (Loew, 1856)
Dactylolabis dilatatoides Savchenko, 1978
Dactylolabis diluta Alexander, 1922
Dactylolabis gracilistylus Alexander, 1926
Dactylolabis grunini Savchenko, 1978
Dactylolabis hirtipes Savchenko, 1978
Dactylolabis hispida Alexander, 1966
Dactylolabis hortensia (Alexander, 1914)
Dactylolabis hudsonica Alexander, 1931
Dactylolabis imitata Alexander, 1945
Dactylolabis jonica Lackschewitz, 1940
Dactylolabis knowltoni Alexander, 1941
Dactylolabis laticellula Savchenko, 1978
Dactylolabis longicauda Alexander, 1922
Dactylolabis luteipyga Alexander, 1955
Dactylolabis mokanica Alexander, 1940
Dactylolabis montana (Osten Sacken, 1860)
Dactylolabis nitidithorax (Alexander, 1918)
Dactylolabis novaezemblae (Alexander, 1925)
Dactylolabis nubecula Kuntze, 1913
Dactylolabis opaca Savchenko, 1978
Dactylolabis parviloba Alexander, 1944
Dactylolabis pechlaneri Mendl, 1976
Dactylolabis pemetica Alexander, 1936
Dactylolabis postiana Alexander, 1944
Dactylolabis pteropoecila (Alexander, 1921)
Dactylolabis retrograda Savchenko, 1978
Dactylolabis rhicnoptiloides (Alexander, 1919)
Dactylolabis rhodia Loew, 1869
Dactylolabis satanas Savchenko, 1971
Dactylolabis sexmaculata (Macquart, 1826)
Dactylolabis sohiyi Byers & Rossman, 2003
Dactylolabis sparsimacula Alexander, 1942
Dactylolabis subdilatata Stary, 1969
Dactylolabis supernumeraria Alexander, 1929
Dactylolabis symplectoidea Egger, 1863
Dactylolabis transversa (Meigen, 1804)
Dactylolabis wodzickii (Nowicki, 1867)

Subgenus Eudactylolabis Alexander, 1950
Dactylolabis damula (Osten Sacken, 1877)
Dactylolabis vestigipennis Alexander, 1950
