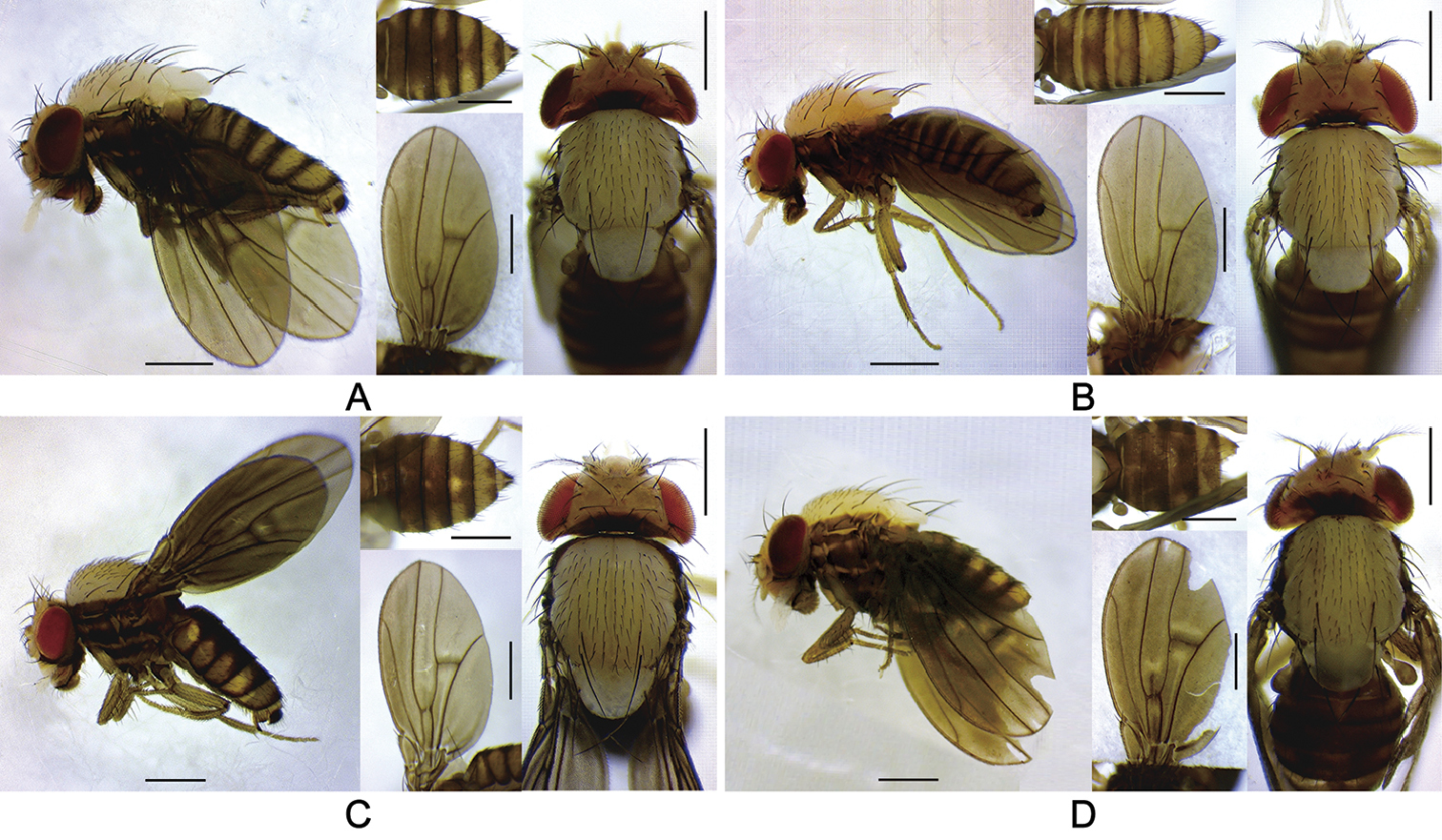
- Dudaica species

Scientific classification
- Domain: Eukaryota
- Kingdom: Animalia
- Phylum: Arthropoda
- Class: Insecta
- Order: Diptera
- Family: Drosophilidae
- Subfamily: Drosophilinae
- Genus: Drosophila
- Subgenus: Dudaica
- Species: D. albipalpis

Binomial name
- Drosophila albipalpis Katoh, Toda & Gao, 2018

= Drosophila albipalpis =

Species of fly

Drosophila albipalpis is a species of fly in the subgenus Dudaica.
