= Drosophila histrio =

Scientific classification
- Kingdom: Animalia
- Phylum: Arthropoda
- Clade: Pancrustacea
- Class: Insecta
- Order: Diptera
- Family: Drosophilidae
- Genus: Drosophila
- Species: D. histrio

Binomial name
- Drosophila histrio Meigen, 1830

Synonyms
- Drosophila historio Tan et al., 1949; Drosophila hystrio Frolova, 1926<nr> Drosophila pokornyi Duda, 1924

Species of fly

Drosophila histrio is a species of fruit fly in the Drosophilidae family, which was first described in 1830 by the German entomologist, Johann Wilhelm Meigen.

It is "widespread in the Palearctic from Europe to Japan", and is found in Korea.
