= Drosophila senilis =

Scientific classification
- Domain: Eukaryota
- Kingdom: Animalia
- Phylum: Arthropoda
- Class: Insecta
- Order: Diptera
- Family: Drosophilidae
- Subfamily: Drosophilinae
- Genus: Drosophila
- Subgenus: Dudaica
- Species: D. senilis

Binomial name
- Drosophila senilis Duda, 1926

Species of fly

Drosophila senilis is a species of fly; it is the type species of the subgenus Dudaica.
