= Drosophila gracilipalpis =

Scientific classification
- Kingdom: Animalia
- Phylum: Arthropoda
- Clade: Pancrustacea
- Class: Insecta
- Order: Diptera
- Family: Drosophilidae
- Subfamily: Drosophilinae
- Genus: Drosophila
- Subgenus: Dudaica
- Species: D. gracilipalpis

Binomial name
- Drosophila gracilipalpis Katoh & Gao, 2018

Species of fly

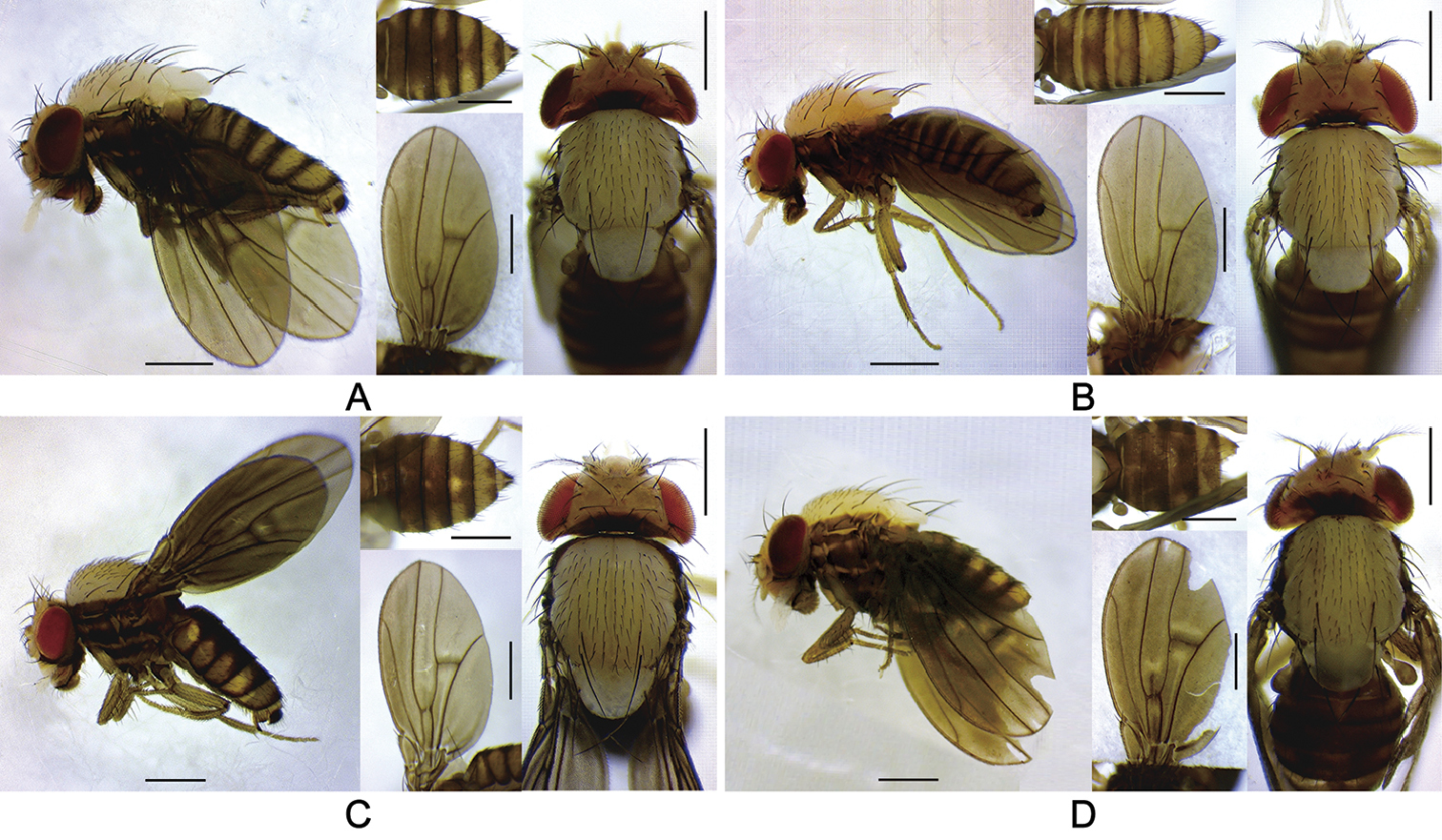
Figure 2; Left lateral habitus, thorax, wing, and abdomen of Dudaica species (part 1). A malayana (Takada) (#03904) B gracilipalpis sp. n. (paratype #03902)

Drosophila gracilipalpis is a species of fly in the subgenus Dudaica.
