= Drosophila acanthostoma =

Scientific classification
- Domain: Eukaryota
- Kingdom: Animalia
- Phylum: Arthropoda
- Class: Insecta
- Order: Diptera
- Family: Drosophilidae
- Genus: Drosophila
- Species: D. acanthostoma

Binomial name
- Drosophila acanthostoma Hardy & Kaneshiro, 1968

Species of fly

Drosophila acanthostoma is a species of fly in the genus Drosophila. It is found in Hawaii.
