= Drosophila californica =

Scientific classification
- Kingdom: Animalia
- Phylum: Arthropoda
- Class: Insecta
- Order: Diptera
- Family: Drosophilidae
- Genus: Drosophila
- Species: D. californica

Binomial name
- Drosophila californica Sturtevant, 1923

Species of fruit fly

Drosophila californica is a species of fruit fly. It has been found in Yosemite National Park in California.
