= Drosophila acanthomera =

Scientific classification
- Domain: Eukaryota
- Kingdom: Animalia
- Phylum: Arthropoda
- Class: Insecta
- Order: Diptera
- Family: Drosophilidae
- Genus: Drosophila
- Species: D. acanthomera

Binomial name
- Drosophila acanthomera Tsacas, 2001

Species of insect

Drosophila acanthomera is a species of fruit fly in the genus Drosophila.
