= Drosophila coffeata =

Scientific classification
- Kingdom: Animalia
- Phylum: Arthropoda
- Clade: Pancrustacea
- Class: Insecta
- Order: Diptera
- Family: Drosophilidae
- Subfamily: Drosophilinae
- Genus: Drosophila
- Subgenus: Drosophila
- Species: D. coffeata

Binomial name
- Drosophila coffeata Williston, 1896

Synonyms
- Drosophila flavolineata Duda, 1927; Drosophila umbripennis Hendel, 1936

Species of fly

Drosophila coffeata is a species of fruit fly in the Drosophila coffeata species group.

== Distribution ==
Saint Vincent and the Grenadines, Brazil.
