= Drosophila acanthos =

Scientific classification
- Domain: Eukaryota
- Kingdom: Animalia
- Phylum: Arthropoda
- Class: Insecta
- Order: Diptera
- Family: Drosophilidae
- Genus: Drosophila
- Species: D. acanthos

Binomial name
- Drosophila acanthos Kam & Perreira, 2003

Species of fly

Drosophila acanthos is a species of fly in the genus Drosophila.
