= Drosophila cathara =

Scientific classification
- Domain: Eukaryota
- Kingdom: Animalia
- Phylum: Arthropoda
- Class: Insecta
- Order: Diptera
- Family: Drosophilidae
- Genus: Drosophila
- Species: D. cathara

Binomial name
- Drosophila cathara Tsacas, 2004

Species of fly

Drosophila cathara is a species of fly in the genus Drosophila. It is found in Cameroon and the Republic of the Congo.
