= Drosophila sui =

Scientific classification
- Kingdom: Animalia
- Phylum: Arthropoda
- Class: Insecta
- Order: Diptera
- Family: Drosophilidae
- Genus: Drosophila
- Species: D. sui

Binomial name
- Drosophila sui Lin & Tseng, 1973

Species of fly

Drosophila sui is a species of fruit fly in the genus Drosophila, described by Lin and Tseng in 1973.

It is endemic to Taiwan.
