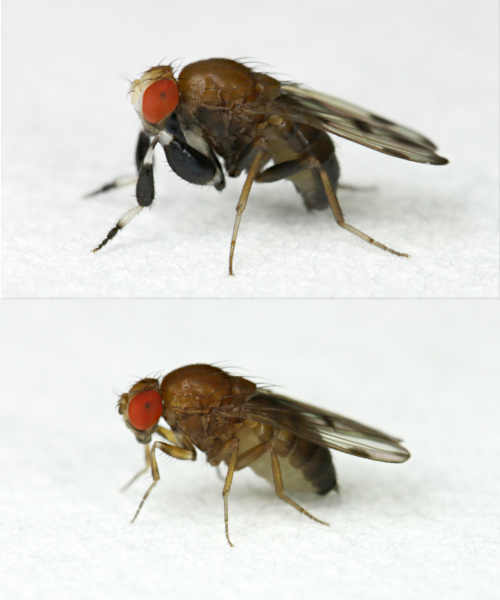

Scientific classification
- Domain: Eukaryota
- Kingdom: Animalia
- Phylum: Arthropoda
- Class: Insecta
- Order: Diptera
- Family: Drosophilidae
- Genus: Drosophila
- Species: D. prolongata

Binomial name
- Drosophila prolongata (Singh and Gupta, 1977)

= Drosophila prolongata =

Species of fly

Drosophila prolongata commonly referred to as the panda fly, is a fly of the family Drosophilidae. This species is endemic to southeast Asia. Males of this species express one of the most extreme reversed sexual size dimorphism (i.e. males are larger than females) in the Drosophilidae, making this species an interesting model organism for the study of sexual selection. Males also display remarkable copulation courtship behaviour.
