= Drosophila sulfurigaster =

Scientific classification
- Kingdom: Animalia
- Phylum: Arthropoda
- Class: Insecta
- Order: Diptera
- Family: Drosophilidae
- Genus: Drosophila
- Species: D. sulfurigaster

Binomial name
- Drosophila sulfurigaster (Duda, 1923)

Synonyms
- Drosophila albostrigata Wheeler, 1969; Drosophila spinofemora Patterson & Wheeler, 1942; Drosophila willowsi Curran, 1936; Drosophila bilimbata Bezzi, 1928; Drosophila albovittata Duda, 1926; Drosophila setifemur Malloch, 1924

Species of fly

Drosophila sulfurigaster is a species of fly (the taxonomic order Diptera) in the family Drosophilidae. It was first described by Oswald Duda in 1923.
