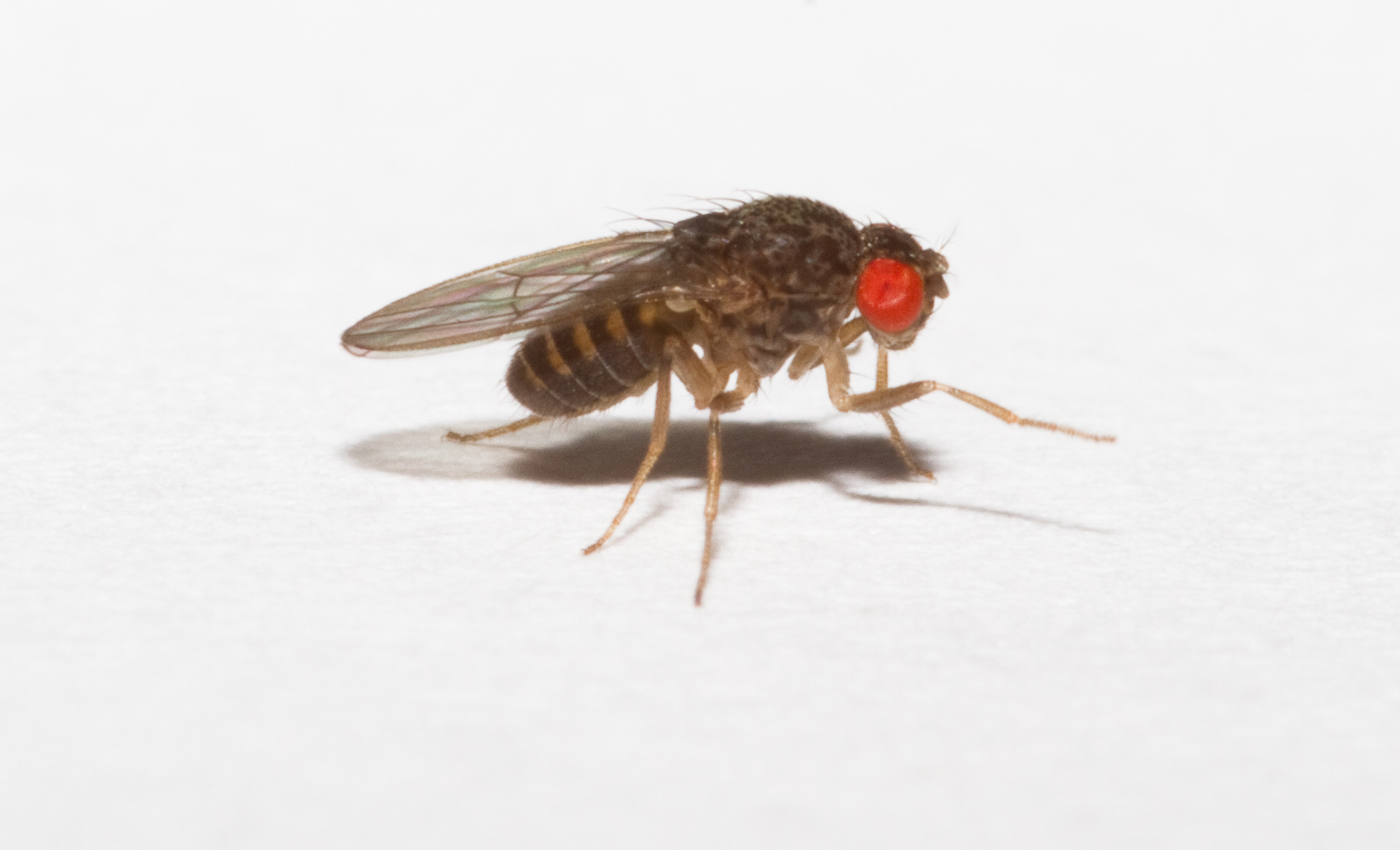
- Drosophila hydei

Scientific classification
- Kingdom: Animalia
- Phylum: Arthropoda
- Class: Insecta
- Order: Diptera
- Family: Drosophilidae
- Genus: Drosophila
- Species: D. hydei

Binomial name
- Drosophila hydei Sturtevant, 1921

= Drosophila hydei =

Species of fly

Drosophila hydei is a species of Diptera, or the order of flies, in the family Drosophilidae. It is a species in the hydei species subgroup, a group in the repleta species group. Bizarrely, it is also known for having approximately 23 mm long sperm, 10 times the length of the male's body. Drosophila hydei are commonly found on compost piles worldwide, and can be rudimentarily identified by eye owing to their large size and variegated pigment pattern on the thorax. The name derives from Dr R. R. Hyde, who first discovered that the species was distinct from Drosophila repleta. D. hydei are one of the more popular flies used as feeders in the pet trade. A few varieties are available, some flightless. They are very similar to Drosophila melanogaster, despite having separated 50 million years ago.

Wild populations of D. hydei can be infected with Spiroplasma bacteria that defend the fly against parasitoid wasps.

== Contribution to invertebrate genetics ==
The Class II "Minos" transposon was identified as a repetitive element in the genome of Drosophila hydei. Minos transgenic tools derived from the element in Drosophila hydei have been used in an extremely wide variety of invertebrate and arthropod genomes to disrupt genes for study. Minos is a member of the Tc1/mariner family of DNA transposons. In the genetic workhorse Drosophila melanogaster, Minos transgenesis has been used to disrupt over 10,000 genes as part of the "Drosophila Gene Disruption Project," allowing the study of their function.

== Sperm ==
Large sperm is a noted phenomenon among Drosophila species, but Drosophila hydei have the largest recorded sperm at over 20 mm long. This seems to be linked to female flies mating more often. There is a trend that as sperm metabolic rate increases, female mating frequency and sperm length increase. The DNA required to make this sperm has large introns, genetic material that is removed before the rest is translated into proteins. The genes blanks and heph show strong likelihood of being the regulators of this process.
