= Immunology =

Branch of medicine studying the immune system

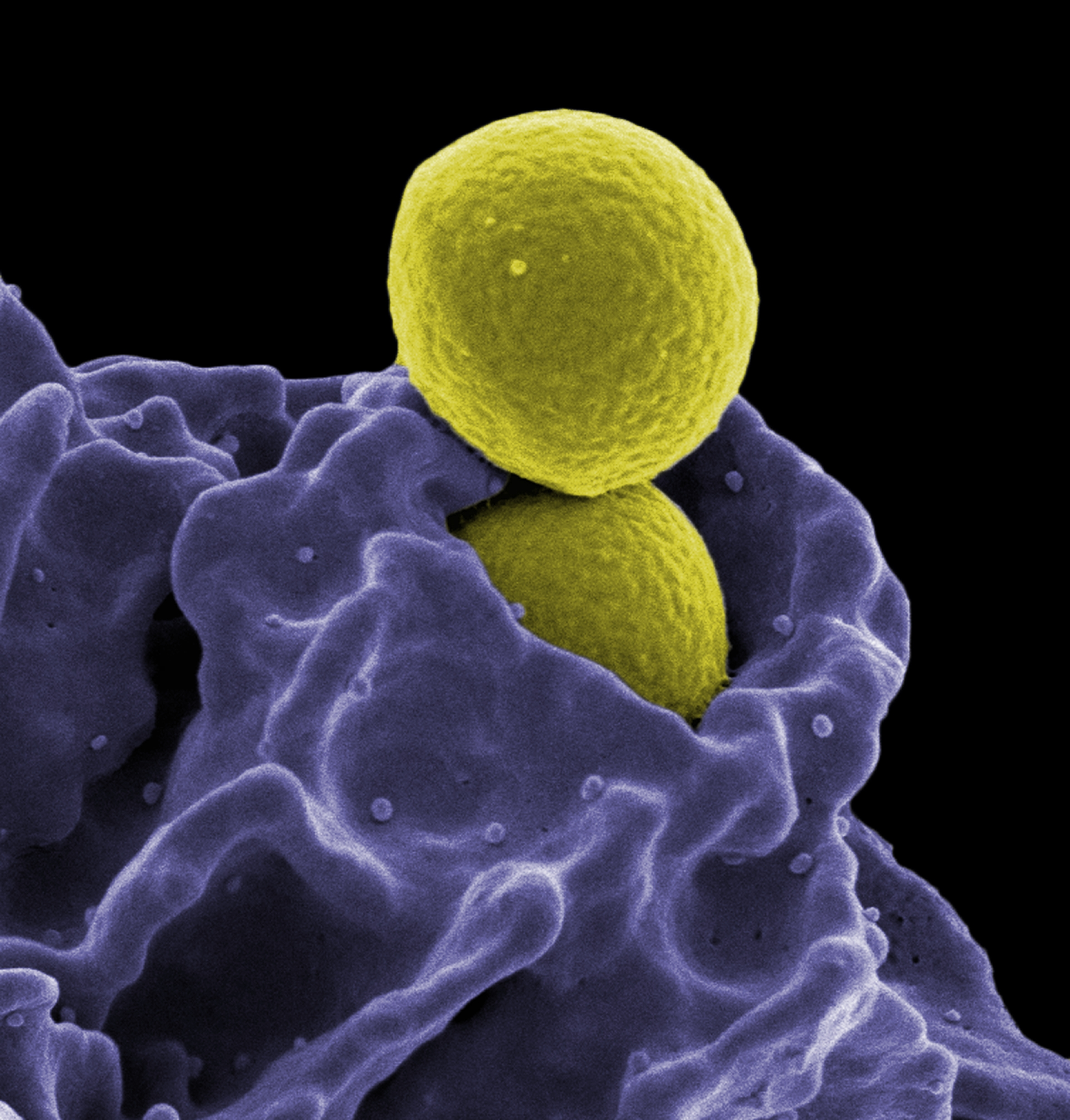
- MRSA (yellow) engulfed by neutrophil (purple) Photo Source: National Institute of Allergy and Infectious Diseases
- System: Immune
- Subdivisions: Cellular; Clinical; Genetic (Immunogenetics) Humoral (Humoral Immunity)
- Significant diseases: Rheumatoid arthritis Inflammation: Autoimmune disease; Hypersensitivity; Immune disorder; Immunodeficiency
- Significant tests: Agglutination; Immunoassay; Immunoprecipitation; Serology
- Specialist: Immunologist

Immunology is a branch of biology and medicine that covers the study of immune systems in all organisms.

Immunology charts, measures, and contextualizes the physiological functioning of the immune system in states of both health and diseases; malfunctions of the immune system in immunological disorders (such as autoimmune diseases, hypersensitivities, immune deficiency, and transplant rejection); and the physical, chemical, and physiological characteristics of the components of the immune system in vitro, in situ, and in vivo. Immunology has applications in numerous disciplines of medicine, particularly in the fields of organ transplantation, oncology, rheumatology, virology, bacteriology, parasitology, psychiatry, and dermatology.

The term was coined by Russian biologist Ilya Ilyich Mechnikov, who advanced studies on immunology and received the Nobel Prize for his work in 1908 with Paul Ehrlich "in recognition of their work on immunity". He pinned small thorns into starfish larvae and noticed unusual cells surrounding the thorns. This was the active response of the body trying to maintain its integrity. It was Mechnikov who first observed the phenomenon of phagocytosis, in which the body defends itself against a foreign body. Ehrlich accustomed mice to the poisonous ricin and abrin. After feeding them with small but increasing dosages of ricin he ascertained that they had become "ricin-proof". Ehrlich interpreted this as immunization and observed that it was abruptly initiated after a few days and was still in existence after several months.

Prior to the designation of immunity, from the etymological root immunis, which is Latin for 'exempt', early physicians characterized organs that would later be proven as essential components of the immune system. The important lymphoid organs of the immune system are the thymus, bone marrow, and chief lymphatic tissues such as spleen, tonsils, lymph vessels, lymph nodes, adenoids, and liver. However, many components of the immune system are cellular in nature, and not associated with specific organs, but rather embedded or circulating in various tissues located throughout the body.

== Classical immunology ==
Classical immunology ties in with the fields of epidemiology and medicine. It studies the relationship between the body systems, pathogens, and immunity. The earliest written mention of immunity can be traced back to the plague of Athens in 430 BCE. Thucydides noted that people who had recovered from a previous bout of the disease could nurse the sick without contracting the illness a second time. Many other ancient societies have references to this phenomenon, but it was not until the 19th and 20th centuries before the concept developed into scientific theory.

The study of the molecular and cellular components that comprise the immune system, including their function and interaction, is the central science of immunology. The immune system has been divided into a more primitive innate immune system and, in vertebrates, an acquired or adaptive immune system. The latter is further divided into humoral (or antibody) and cell-mediated components.

The immune system has the capability of self and non-self-recognition. An antigen is a substance that ignites the immune response. The cells involved in recognizing the antigen are Lymphocytes. Once they recognize, they secrete antibodies. Antibodies are proteins that neutralize the disease-causing microorganisms. Antibodies do not directly kill pathogens, but instead, identify antigens as targets for destruction by other immune cells such as phagocytes or NK cells.

The (antibody) response is defined as the interaction between antibodies and antigens. Antibodies are specific proteins released from a certain class of immune cells known as B lymphocytes, while antigens are defined as anything that elicits the generation of antibodies (antibody generators). Immunology rests on an understanding of the properties of these two biological entities and the cellular response to both.

It is now getting clear that the immune responses contribute to the development of many common disorders not traditionally viewed as immunologic, including metabolic, cardiovascular, cancer, and neurodegenerative conditions like Alzheimer's disease. Besides, there are direct implications of the immune system in the infectious diseases (tuberculosis, malaria, hepatitis, pneumonia, dysentery, and helminth infestations) as well. Hence, research in the field of immunology is of prime importance for the advancements in the fields of modern medicine, biomedical research, and biotechnology.

== Diagnostic immunology ==
The specificity of the bond between antibody and antigen has made the antibody an excellent tool for the detection of substances by a variety of diagnostic techniques. Antibodies specific for a desired antigen can be conjugated with an isotopic (radio) or fluorescent label or with a color-forming enzyme in order to detect it. However, the similarity between some antigens can lead to false positives and other errors in such tests by antibodies cross-reacting with antigens that are not exact matches.

== Immunotherapy ==
The use of immune system components or antigens to treat a disease or disorder is known as immunotherapy. Immunotherapy is most commonly used to treat allergies, autoimmune disorders such as Crohn's disease, Hashimoto's thyroiditis and rheumatoid arthritis, and certain cancers. Immunotherapy is also often used for patients who are immunosuppressed (such as those with HIV) and people with other immune deficiencies. This includes regulating factors such as IL-2, IL-10, GM-CSF B, IFN-α.

== Clinical immunology ==
Clinical immunology is the study of diseases caused by disorders of the immune system (failure, aberrant action, and malignant growth of the cellular elements of the system). It also involves diseases of other systems, where immune reactions play a part in the pathology and clinical features.

The diseases caused by disorders of the immune system fall into two broad categories:

- immunodeficiency, in which parts of the immune system fail to provide an adequate response (examples include chronic granulomatous disease and primary immune diseases);
- autoimmunity, in which the immune system attacks its own host's body (examples include systemic lupus erythematosus, rheumatoid arthritis, Hashimoto's disease and myasthenia gravis).

Other immune system disorders include various hypersensitivities (such as in asthma and other allergies) that respond inappropriately to otherwise harmless compounds.

The most well-known disease that affects the immune system itself is AIDS, an immunodeficiency characterized by the suppression of CD4+ ("helper") T cells, dendritic cells and macrophages by the human immunodeficiency virus (HIV).

Clinical immunologists also study ways to prevent the immune system's attempts to destroy allografts (transplant rejection).

Clinical immunology and allergy is usually a subspecialty of internal medicine or pediatrics. Fellows in Clinical Immunology are typically exposed to many of the different aspects of the specialty and treat allergic conditions, primary immunodeficiencies and systemic autoimmune and autoinflammatory conditions. As part of their training fellows may do additional rotations in rheumatology, pulmonology, otorhinolaryngology, dermatology and the immunologic lab.

=== Clinical and pathology immunology ===
When health conditions worsen to emergency status, portions of immune system organs, including the thymus, spleen, bone marrow, lymph nodes, and other lymphatic tissues, can be surgically excised for examination while patients are still alive.

== Theoretical immunology ==
Immunology is strongly experimental in everyday practice but is also characterized by an ongoing theoretical attitude. Many theories have been suggested in immunology from the end of the nineteenth century up to the present time. The end of the 19th century and the beginning of the 20th century saw a battle between "cellular" and "humoral" theories of immunity. According to the cellular theory of immunity, represented in particular by Elie Metchnikoff, it was cells – more precisely, phagocytes – that were responsible for immune responses. In contrast, the humoral theory of immunity, held by Robert Koch and Emil von Behring, among others, stated that the active immune agents were soluble components (molecules) found in the organism's "humors" rather than its cells.

In the mid-1950s, Macfarlane Burnet, inspired by a suggestion made by Niels Jerne, formulated the clonal selection theory (CST) of immunity. On the basis of CST, Burnet developed a theory of how an immune response is triggered according to the self/nonself distinction: "self" constituents (constituents of the body) do not trigger destructive immune responses, while "nonself" entities (e.g., pathogens, an allograft) trigger a destructive immune response. The theory was later modified to reflect new discoveries regarding histocompatibility or the complex "two-signal" activation of T cells. The self/nonself theory of immunity and the self/nonself vocabulary have been criticized, but remain very influential.

More recently, several theoretical frameworks have been suggested in immunology, including "autopoietic" views, "cognitive immune" views, the "danger model" (or "danger theory"), and the "discontinuity" theory. The danger model, suggested by Polly Matzinger and colleagues, has been very influential, arousing many comments and discussions.

== Developmental immunology ==
The body's capability to react to antigens depends on a person's age, antigen type, maternal factors and the area where the antigen is presented. Neonates are said to be in a state of physiological immunodeficiency, because both their innate and adaptive immunological responses are greatly suppressed. Once born, a child's immune system responds favorably to protein antigens while not as well to glycoproteins and polysaccharides. In fact, many of the infections acquired by neonates are caused by low virulence organisms like Staphylococcus and Pseudomonas. In neonates, opsonic activity and the ability to activate the complement cascade is very limited. For example, the mean level of C3 in a newborn is approximately 65% of that found in the adult. Phagocytic activity is also greatly impaired in newborns. This is due to lower opsonic activity, as well as diminished up-regulation of integrin and selectin receptors, which limit the ability of neutrophils to interact with adhesion molecules in the endothelium. Their monocytes are slow and have a reduced ATP production, which also limits the newborn's phagocytic activity. Although, the number of total lymphocytes is significantly higher than in adults, the cellular and humoral immunity is also impaired. Antigen-presenting cells in newborns have a reduced capability to activate T cells. Also, T cells of a newborn proliferate poorly and produce very small amounts of cytokines like IL-2, IL-4, IL-5, IL-12, and IFN-g which limits their capacity to activate the humoral response as well as the phagocitic activity of macrophage. B cells develop early during gestation but are not fully active.

Artist's impression of monocytes

Maternal factors also play a role in the body's immune response. At birth, most of the immunoglobulin present is maternal IgG. These antibodies are transferred from the placenta to the fetus using the FcRn (neonatal Fc receptor). Because IgM, IgD, IgE and IgA do not cross the placenta, they are almost undetectable at birth. Some IgA is provided by breast milk. These passively-acquired antibodies can protect the newborn for up to 18 months, but their response is usually short-lived and of low affinity. These antibodies can also produce a negative response. If a child is exposed to the antibody for a particular antigen before being exposed to the antigen itself then the child will produce a dampened response. Passively acquired maternal antibodies can suppress the antibody response to active immunization. Similarly, the response of T-cells to vaccination differs in children compared to adults, and vaccines that induce Th1 responses in adults do not readily elicit these same responses in neonates. Between six and nine months after birth, a child's immune system begins to respond more strongly to glycoproteins, but there is usually no marked improvement in their response to polysaccharides until they are at least one year old. This can be the reason for distinct time frames found in vaccination schedules.

During adolescence, the human body undergoes various physical, physiological and immunological changes triggered and mediated by hormones, of which the most significant in females is 17-β-estradiol (an estrogen) and, in males, is testosterone. Estradiol usually begins to act around the age of 10 and testosterone some months later. There is evidence that these steroids not only act directly on the primary and secondary sexual characteristics but also have an effect on the development and regulation of the immune system, including an increased risk in developing pubescent and post-pubescent autoimmunity. There is also some evidence that cell surface receptors on B cells and macrophages may detect sex hormones in the system.

The female sex hormone 17-β-estradiol has been shown to regulate the level of immunological response, while some male androgens such as testosterone seem to suppress the stress response to infection. Other androgens, however, such as DHEA, increase immune response. As in females, the male sex hormones seem to have more control of the immune system during puberty and post-puberty than during the rest of a male's adult life.

Physical changes during puberty such as thymic involution also affect immunological response.

== Ecoimmunology and behavioural immunity ==
Ecoimmunology, or ecological immunology, explores the relationship between the immune system of an organism and its social, biotic and abiotic environment.

More recent ecoimmunological research has focused on host pathogen defences traditionally considered "non-immunological", such as pathogen avoidance, self-medication, symbiont-mediated defenses, and fecundity trade-offs. Behavioural immunity, a phrase coined by Mark Schaller, specifically refers to psychological pathogen avoidance drivers, such as disgust aroused by stimuli encountered around pathogen-infected individuals, such as the smell of vomit. More broadly, "behavioural" ecological immunity has been demonstrated in multiple species. For example, the Monarch butterfly often lays its eggs on certain toxic milkweed species when infected with parasites. These toxins reduce parasite growth in the offspring of the infected Monarch. However, when uninfected Monarch butterflies are forced to feed only on these toxic plants, they suffer a fitness cost as reduced lifespan relative to other uninfected Monarch butterflies. This indicates that laying eggs on toxic plants is a costly behaviour in Monarchs which has probably evolved to reduce the severity of parasite infection.

Symbiont-mediated defenses are also heritable across host generations, despite a non-genetic direct basis for the transmission. Aphids, for example, rely on several different symbionts for defense from key parasites, and can vertically transmit their symbionts from parent to offspring. Therefore, a symbiont that successfully confers protection from a parasite is more likely to be passed to the host offspring, allowing coevolution with parasites attacking the host in a way similar to traditional immunity.

The preserved immune tissues of extinct species, such as the thylacine (Thylacine cynocephalus), can also provide insights into their biology.

== Cancer immunology ==
The study of the interaction of the immune system with cancer cells can lead to diagnostic tests and therapies with which to find and fight cancer. The immunology concerned with physiological reaction characteristic of the immune state. Inflammation is an immune response that has been observed in many types of cancers.

== Reproductive immunology ==
This area of the immunology is devoted to the study of immunological aspects of the reproductive process including fetus acceptance. The term has also been used by fertility clinics to address fertility problems, recurrent miscarriages, premature deliveries and dangerous complications such as pre-eclampsia.

== See also ==
- List of immunologists
- Immunomics
- International Reviews of Immunology
- Outline of immunology
- History of immunology
- Osteoimmunology
