= Drosophila nigrospiracula =

Scientific classification
- Kingdom: Animalia
- Phylum: Arthropoda
- Class: Insecta
- Order: Diptera
- Family: Drosophilidae
- Genus: Drosophila
- Species: D. nigrospiracula

Binomial name
- Drosophila nigrospiracula Patterson and Wheeler, 1942

Species of fly

Drosophila nigrospiracula is a fly species indigenous to the Sonoran Desert, spanning Arizona, Baja California, and part of Sonora, Mexico. D. nigrospiracula share the Sonoran Desert with three other species of Drosophila: D. pachea, D. mettleri, and D. mojavensis. This fly breeds on the decomposing tissues of two species of cacti that are also endemic to the region: cardón (Pachycereus pringlei) and saguaro (Carnegiea gigantea).

== Taxonomy ==
D. nigrospiracula is part of the D. anceps species complex. This species is categorized as part of the D. mulleri subgroup, one of the five subgroups within the Drosophila repleta group of the Drosophila genus. The four Drosophila fly species inhabiting the Sonoran Desert are not particularly closely related to each other but are all, however, under the repleta group. Each species came to inhabit this region independently, and they experience different resource availability. As such, they adapted independently to the environment of the Sonoran Desert and came to use different cactus species as hosts.

== Habitat ==
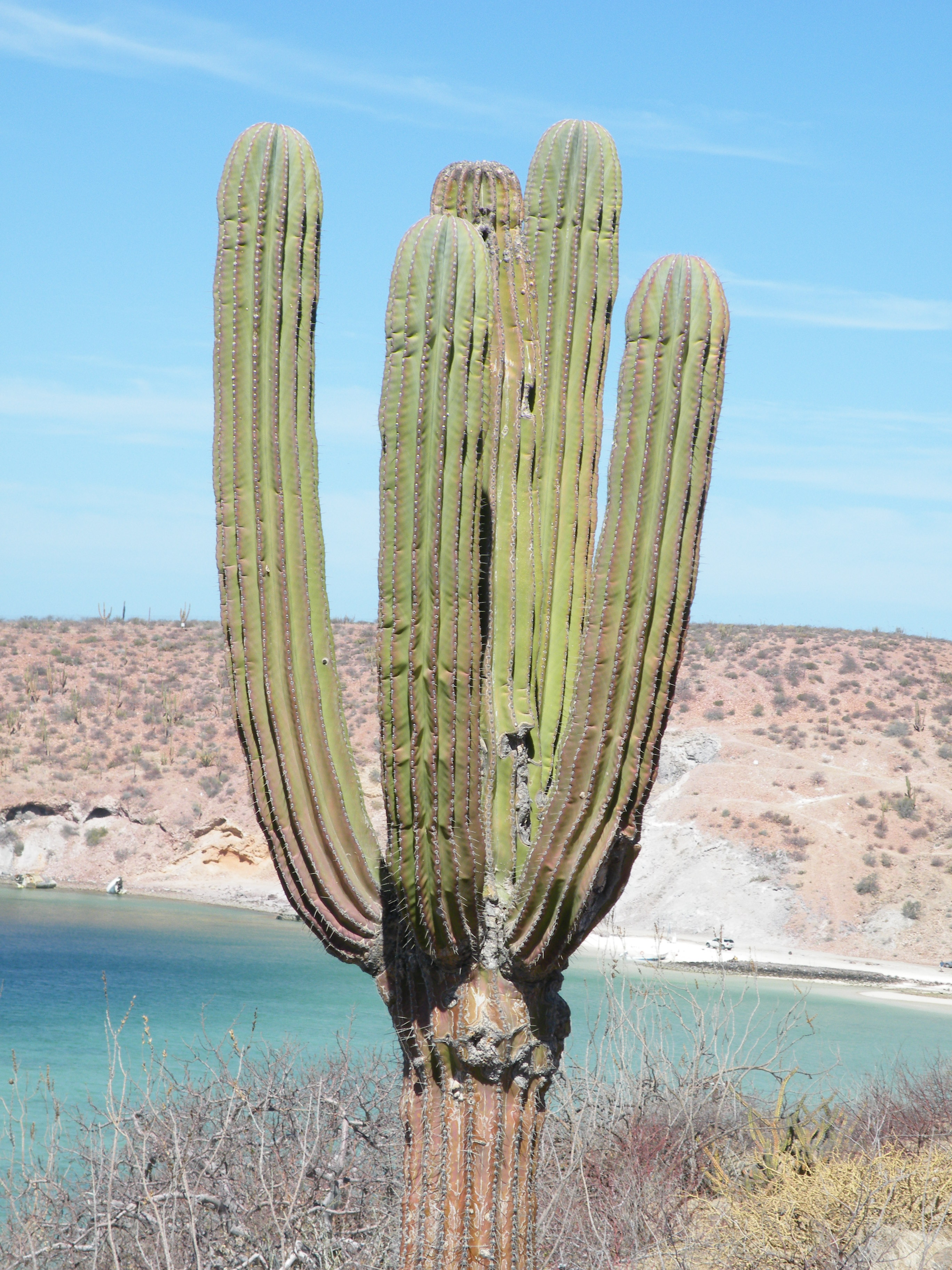
A cardón cactus (Pachycereus pringlei) found in the Baja Peninsula, Sonoran Desert.

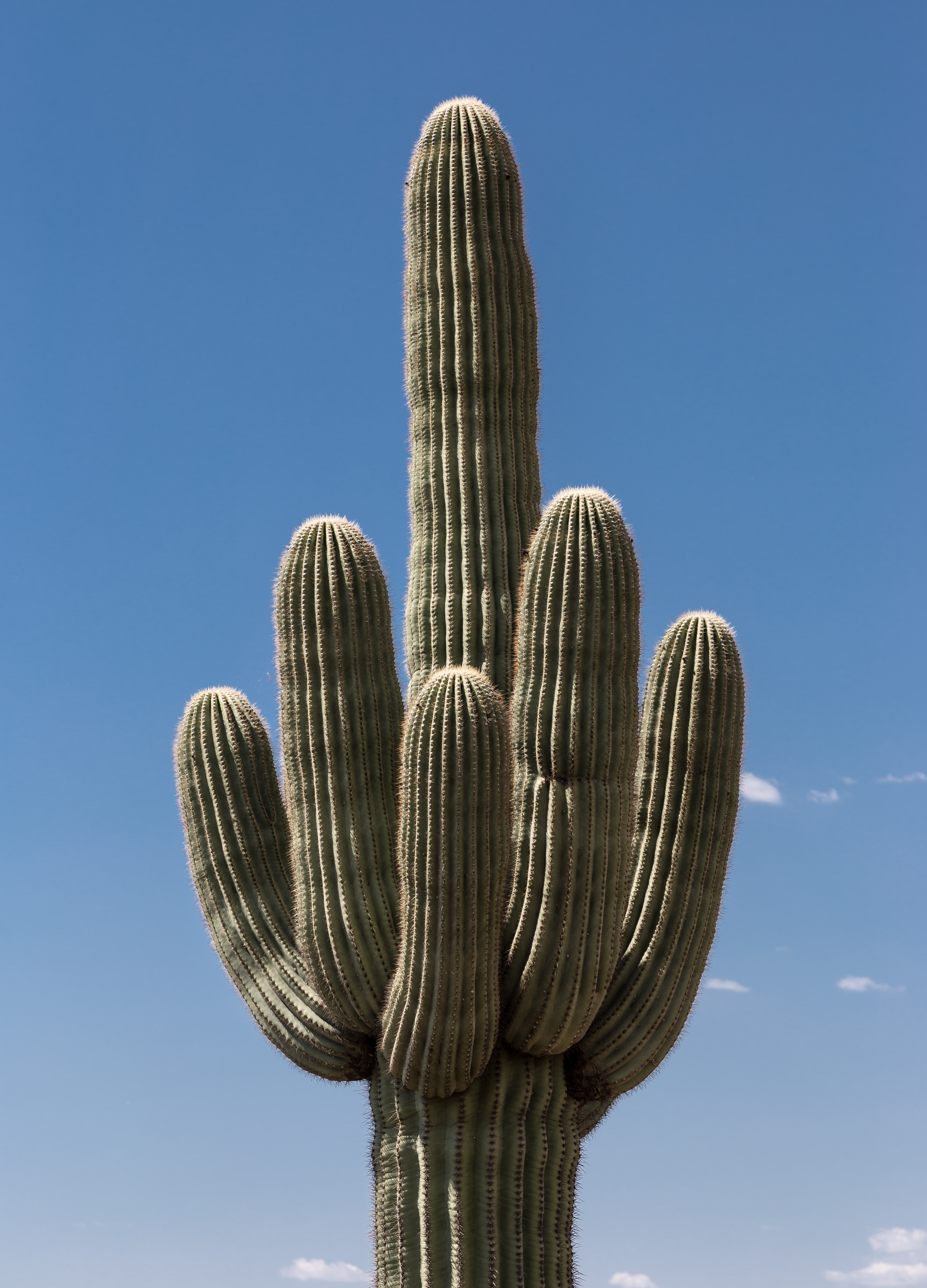
A saguaro cactus (Carnegiea gigantea) found in the Sonoran Desert.

D. nigrospiracula are only found in the Sonoran Desert and specifically on cardón (Pachycereus pringlei) and saguaro (Carnegiea gigantean) cacti. Cardón and saguaro are tall, columnar cacti with similar morphology, chemical composition, and low alkaloid composition (their main allelochemical). Saguaro grow on the main part of the desert, while the cardón species grows only on the Baja peninsula. D. nigrospiracula is restricted to these two forms of cacti because they emit the alkaloids gigantine and carnegine, which D. nigrospiracula can metabolize. These allelochemicals are usually harmful to an insect without the proper allelochemical detoxification enzymes – namely the cytochrome p450 system. In general, formation of plant decay can come from injury or freezing of the cactus. Then, exudate flows down the plant, creating a place for D. nigrospiracula to congregate.

=== Mechanism of metabolism of host plant ===
The cytochrome p450 system is found in nearly all life forms and is responsible for processing pheromones and steroids and also metabolizing insecticides, drugs, mutagens, and carcinogens. The p450 system allows Drosophila to metabolize and detoxify the secondary compounds that the cacti use as a function of herbivore defense in order to viably use the plant as a host.

== Home range ==
Typical population sizes range from 361 to 3,999 flies. These flies commute to other saguaro cacti at rates three times higher than any other Drosophila species; they live in short-lived yet widespread habitats, requiring constant relocation to look for resources. D. nigrospiracula travel up to 2 km per day to gain resources between the low density cacti.

== Life history ==
D. nigrospiracula eggs form in follicles that consist of 15 nurse cells, and a given female's paired ovaries consist of hundreds of follicles. The chromosomes of these flies are polyploid and are actively transcribed to RNA, which is then passed to oocytes to help with embryogenesis. In the final stages of oogenesis, nurse cells dispose of their nuclear components into growing oocytes, providing them resources for embryonic development.

=== Role of phosphorus in egg formation ===
D. nigrospiracula exhibit sexual dimorphism through differing ratios of phosphorus concentration in adult males and females. Females have about 3 times as much phosphorus in their gonads as males. This inequality is due to the importance of phosphorus in the synthesis of nucleic acids during oogenesis. The cacti on which D. nigrospiracula breed and feed have low concentrations of phosphorus, but research has shown that the higher concentration in females comes from the phosphorus transferred from the male to the female during copulation. The phosphorus from the male ejaculate is incorporated into the female ovaries and traceable in RNA and DNA. Inside the female, phosphorus is then used to synthesize nucleic acids necessary in egg production. Reduced phosphorus levels in mature female diets slowed oogenesis.

== Mating ==
Larger males tended to be more successful in mating than smaller males, as they win the male-male competition for females. Females approach males to mate at non-resource-based territories controlled by a male.

D. nigrospiracula has a sex ratio that favors females, as females can mate multiple times in one morning. Additionally, females also are ready to mate 3 days after birth, but males do not reach sexual maturation until they are 9 to 10 days old. These two factors greatly increase the operational sex ratio in favor of females.

=== Courtship ===
D. nigrospiracula exhibit varied mating behavior. Males initiate courtship first by physical contact with females. They then perform wing displays while they encroached the female from behind, often circling the female multiple times. The wing display consisted of quickly opening and then closing of one or both wings, which creates bursts of sound. Males also licked the female genitalia if the female stopped moving. Females showed willingness to mate by spreading their wings, while uninterested females relocated away from the male. Male D. nigrospiracula are persistent in courtship but do not mount an unwilling female.

== Enemies ==
=== Macrocheles subbadius ===
Macrocheles subbadius is an ectoparasite also indigenous to the North American region of the Sonoran Desert that inhabits both saguaro and cardón cacti. It reproduces on moist soil, animal feces, and rotting plant tissue. They obtain nutrients by biting into the integument of flies and intaking the hemolymph found in the body cavity of the fly, using it for nutrients. This parasite reduces the life span of D. nigrospiracula in a manner proportional to the amount of parasites found on the body. Reduction in overall health is due to physical trauma caused by Macrocheles subbadius and also due to the loss of nutrients. This parasite was also found to hinder female fertility and development of offspring. Flies will prefer moving towards light when confronted with the mite, a form of behavioral immunity, as mite infection occurs more easily in dark environments.

=== Effects of parasitism on sexual reproduction ===
Despite energetic costs to courting and mating, D. nigrospiracula increased reproductive efforts when perturbed by parasites. Younger males devoted even more time to courtship when affected by more parasites. The same phenomenon was also observed in a study with older males when lightly affected by parasites, but courtship levels dropped to below control levels when heavily parasitized. Researchers attribute this behavioral characteristic of D. nigrospiracula as an evolutionarily adaptive advantage, as the flies attempt to pass on their genes when lower life expectancy is detected.

However, while parasite-infested Drosophila look to mate at higher frequencies, another study shows that males and females are less likely to find mates. Males have an even harder time finding mates than females even if infected by the same amount of M. subbadius. Furthermore, the intensity of female choice is directly proportional to the depth of parasitic infection. Researchers attribute these observations to reduced male-male competitive ability, decreased courtship vigor, and even physical prevention of copulation.

== Microbiome ==
As mentioned, D. nigrospiracula use the necrotic tissues of the saguaro cactus for mating and also as their food source. However, the microbiota of D. nigrospiracula is significantly different from the microbiota found on cardón and saguaro cacti and actually is more similar to flies from different cacti from other regions. The most abundant of the bacteria does not come from the food on the cacti. These bacterial colonies were colonized through host-to-host transmission by other species and settings.

== Competition with Drosophila mettleri ==
This species shares certain behavioral commonalities with Drosophila mettleri. A major difference between these two fly species, however, that serves to limit the amount of competition between them in nesting site selection is more genetically than behaviorally explained. D. mettleri contains an upregulation in the CYP28A1 gene in the P450 gene family. Upregulation in this gene enables D. mettleri to breed in both the toxic soil surrounding rotting cacti and on the tissues of rotting cacti patches. D. nigrospiracula, however, lacks this upregulated gene and can only nest on the tissues of rotting cacti patches. This particular genetic difference enables both species of desert Drosopholids to use the same host cacti in the same geographic region without competitive pressures.
