= Drosophila mettleri =

Scientific classification
- Kingdom: Animalia
- Phylum: Arthropoda
- Class: Insecta
- Order: Diptera
- Family: Drosophilidae
- Genus: Drosophila
- Subgenus: Drosophila
- Species: D. mettleri

Binomial name
- Drosophila mettleri Heed, 1977

Species of fly

Drosophila mettleri, commonly known as the Sonoran Desert fly, is a fly in the genus Drosophila. The species is found in North America and is most concentrated along the southern coast of California and in Mexico. D. mettleri are dependent on plant hosts, namely, the saguaro and cardon cacti. Thus, they are most prevalent in arid, desert conditions. It is able to detoxify chemicals found in the rotting liquid of cacti hosts, which allows it to use otherwise lethal soil as a nesting site.

Drosophila mettleri was discovered in San Felipe, Baja California in October 1961 during an experiment where banana was used to attract several species of Drosophila. Due to physical geographic barriers between Sonoran Desert flies, gene flow explains speciation.

It breeds in soil moistened by liquid excreted by rotting cacti and on necrotic patches. The liquid found in rotting cacti patches serves as a nutrient source for D. mettleri larvae, despite it containing chemicals toxic to the intestines of other Dipterans. Several aspects of the fly species' courtship behavior, such as its courtship song and copulatory plugs, explain sexual selection methods in this fly.

== Description ==
=== Differences between D. mettleri and D. nigrospiracula ===
Of the Sonoran Desert fly species, D. mettleri behaves, breeds, and is distributed most similarly to D. nigrospiracula. When D. mettleri are collected from cacti in prevalent geographic locations, they are isolated alongside D. nigrospiracula. Both species exploit the toxic sap of their host plants. However, unlike D. nigrospiracula, D. mettleri has a more efficient detoxification system that enables it to nest in areas not exploited by D. nigrospiracula.

Drosophila mettleri prefers to breed in soil moisturized in the sap of injured cacti, while D. nigrospiracula is found in the tissue of the cactus itself and is thus subjected to less concentrated toxin levels as compared to D. mettleri. An up-regulation in the genes encoding for xenobiotic resistance are attributed to the specialized and highly efficient detoxification ability of D. mettleri in comparison to other species. This enables the species to use a breeding ground otherwise lethal to both larvae and adults.

=== Feeding differences ===
Drosophila nigrospiracula solely exploits cactus sap on the plant itself (i.e. in the tissues of the cacti). However, D. mettleri adults are located on both the cactus and in nearby soil, as the fly has the specialized ability to detoxify the highly concentrated sap found in surrounding soil. Females are more commonly located in their breeding ground (the soil), whereas males are situated in both areas.

=== Physical distinction ===
Phenotypic differences and similarities may be used to distinguish between D. mettleri and D. nigrospiracula. Similarities between these two species include large bodies, black carcasses, and thin, defined cheeks that stand in stark contrast to their elongated eyes. Differences between these two species that can be used to decipher between them include the following characteristics that D. mettleri has and D. nigrospiracula does not: toe extensions from the genital region, a frons pollinose that is angularly shaped like a "v", less maturated gonapophysics, and horns on the anterior only (no horns exist on the posterior region).

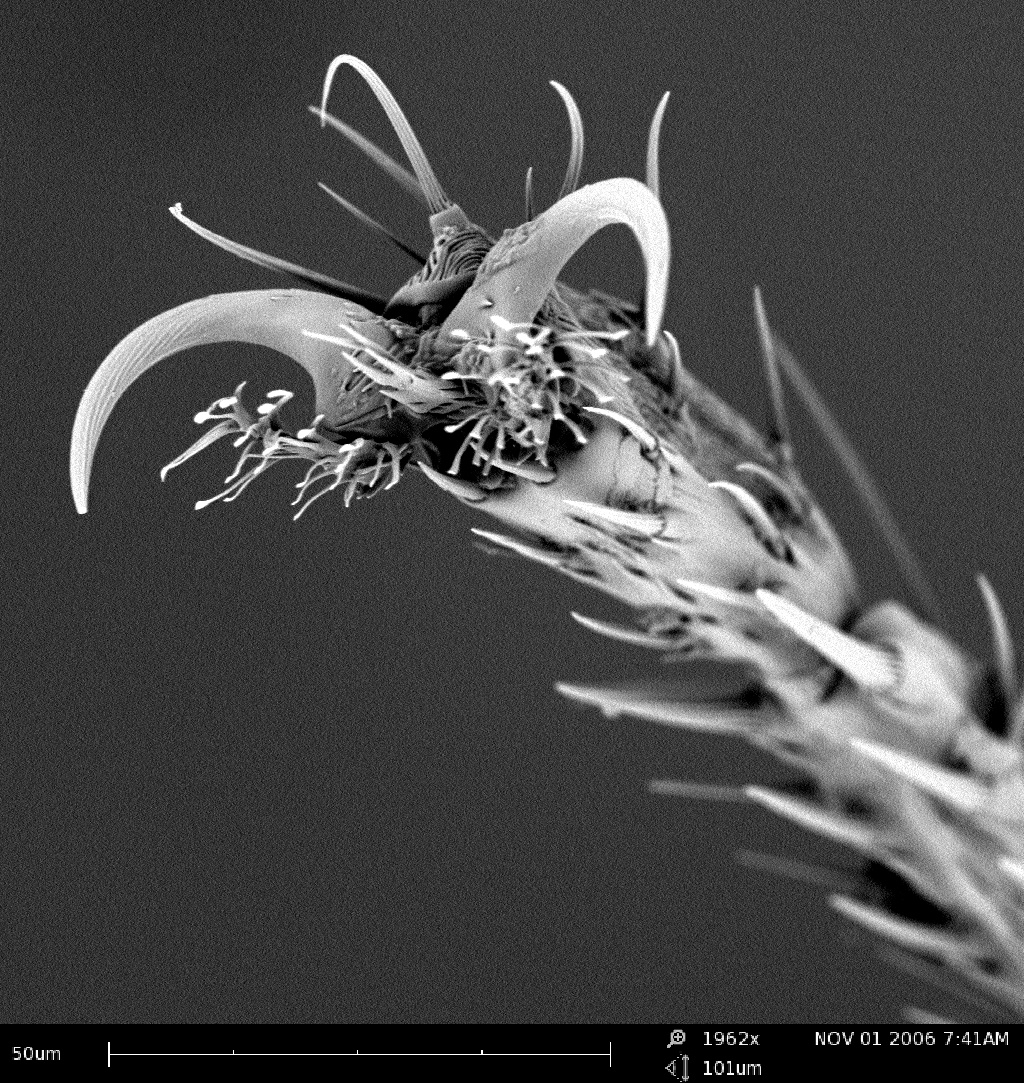
The bristled texture of fly legs is pictured.

== Distribution ==
=== Distribution due to heat ===
The species is most commonly found in North American deserts, specifically, in Mexico and Arizona. The species is also found on the southern coast of California, where they inhabit prickly pears. Of the four species of Drosophila found in the Sonoran Desert, D. mettleri have the lowest heat tolerance.

D. mettleri are abundant through all seasons but are less prevalent during the summer period. Because the necrotic tissue of cacti in the arid environment of the desert characterizes intense heat conditions, the ability of D. mettleri to exploit the nearby soil of the cacti for breeding purposes provides a selective advantage wherein the pupa of this species have a higher survival rate than other Drosophila desert species.

Other species of Drosophila are less successful in the heat of the Sonoran Desert in rearing young due to the intense conditions. Their inability to burrow into the soil has been shown to prove detrimental in increasing pupa survival, yet D. mettleri has an evolutionary advantage in their ability to exploit a niche environment for breeding. The hypothesis that the necrotic tissue of cacti serves as a similarly protective environment as the soil of the Sonoran Desert for other species of Drosophila has been disproven.

While other Drosophila have higher heat tolerances due to their breeding grounds in the necrotic tissue of cacti that is higher in heat, D. mettleri have a lower thermal tolerance because there is no evolutionary advantage to such heat tolerance (ability to exploit the less heat-exposed area of cacti soil).

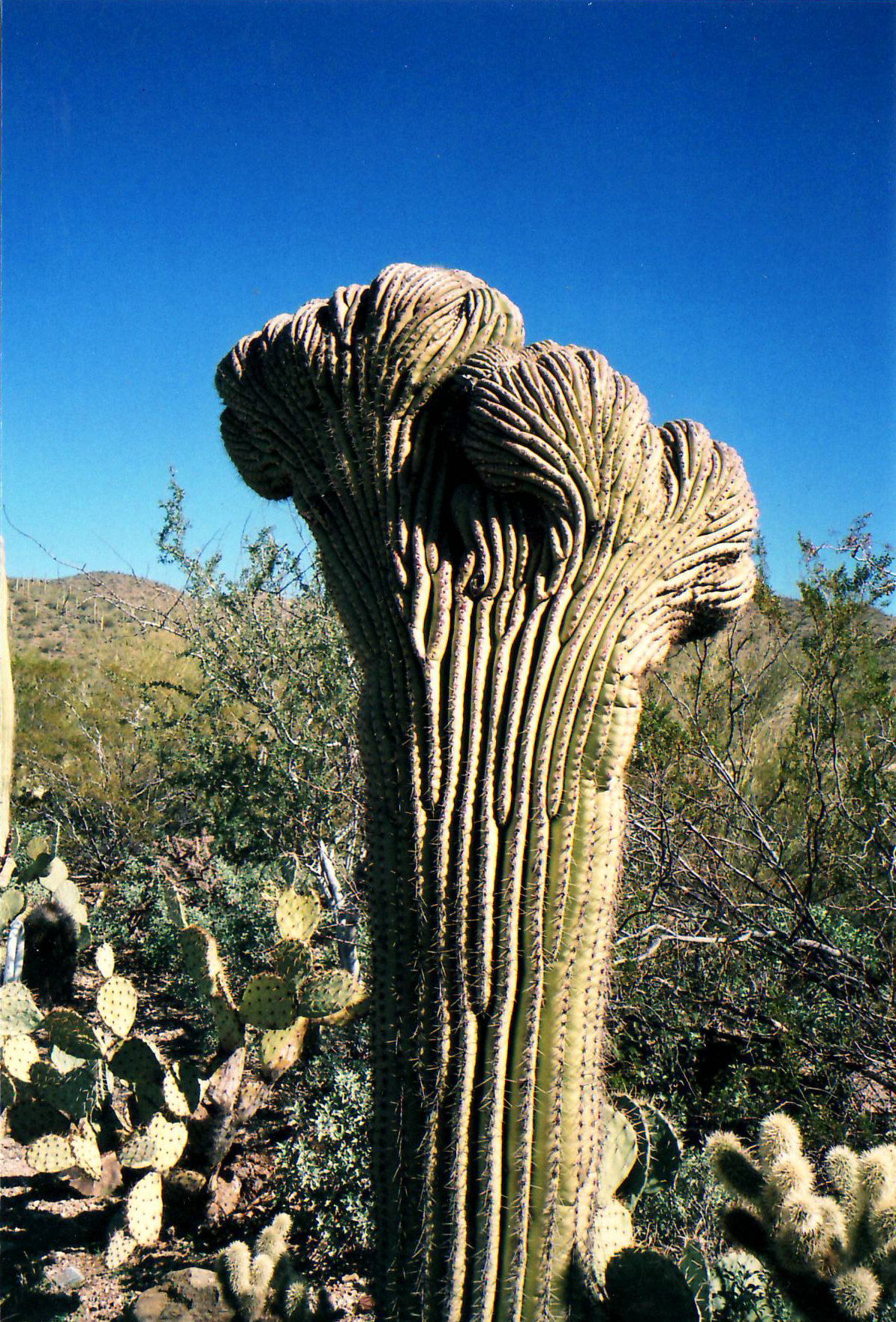
A species of Saguaro cactus, a key host species for D. mettleri.

=== Effects of geographic barriers ===
The geography of the area encompassed by the Sonoran Desert gives rise to genetic differentiation among desert Drosophila species who feed on necrotic rot. The Sonoran Desert incorporates the peninsular region of Baja California and mainland regions of California. After the peninsula was formed, the Gulf of California, which lies between the peninsula and the mainland, served as a barrier to dispersal opportunities in insects and land mammals.

Another physical geographic barrier is the Gran Desierto de Alter, a large sand dune between the peninsula and the mainland. These physical geographic barriers are the cause of gene flow among Sonoran Desert flies. Studies of allozymes in D. mettleri and D. nigrospiracula show differences in nuclear markers that would otherwise suggest differentiation among the regions of the Sonoran Desert. In D. nigrospiracula, there were markers that showed differences within the species when they were located disparately among the peninsular and mainland regions of the desert. In D. mettleri, however, there were no such nuclear marker differences among members of the species found on the peninsula versus those found on the mainland. These differences show that deviations among D. mettleri can be supported through the stepping stone hypothesis.

Each of the relatives of D. mettleri that are closest phylogenetically do not inhabit the Sonoran Desert region; therefore, the four species of Drosophila that do inhabit the Sonoran Desert region experienced parallel evolution instead of speciation within the desert. The species endemic to the Sonoran region, other than D. mettleri, are D. nigrospiracula, D. mojavensis, and D. melanogaster.

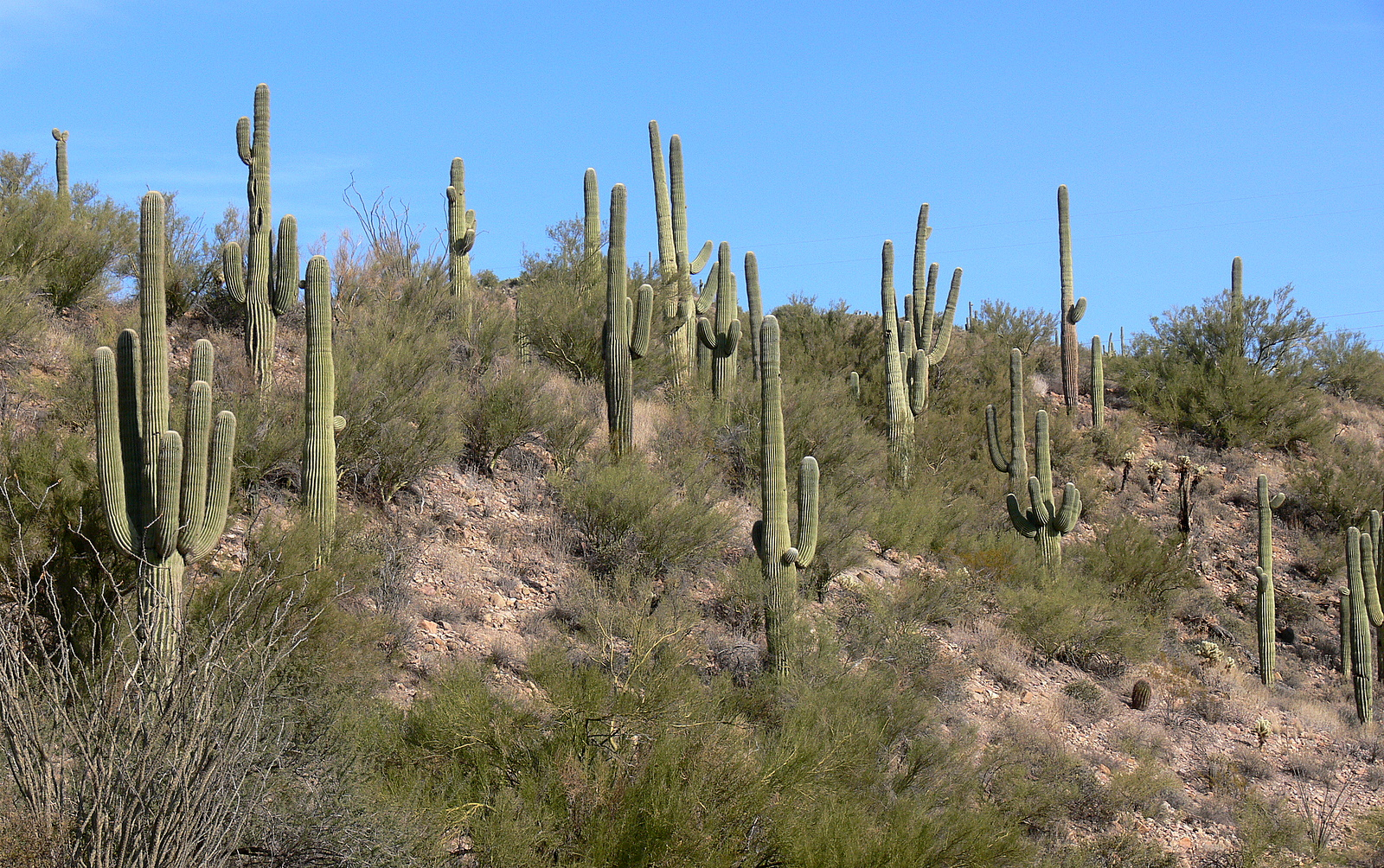
The Sonoran Desert landscape shows the heavy dispersal of host cacti.

== Habitat ==
=== Host plants ===
The main host plants include the saguaro (Carnegiea gigantea), the cardon (Pachycereus pringlei), and the senita (Lophocereus schottii) cacti.

Drosophila mettleri is most commonly found in the saguaro and cardon cacti, in part for these cacti's larger size and cooler internal environments. In addition, these species of cacti release more exudant material into the soil; this enriched soil serves as a nesting site. The necrotic tissues of these cacti may also be used as feeding and nesting sites, yet the exploitation of the rot patches in these cacti is less common in D. mettleri in comparison to other desert Drosophila species.

=== Selection of host plant by rot patches ===
A characteristic pertinent to each of the Sonoran Desert Drosophila species is host cactus selection. Each of these flies chooses to exploit a different host plant for its resources (breeding, food). The selection of host cactus is important to the amount of resources available to each of these species and plays a role in the growth and development of the species.

=== Other factors leading to host selection ===
Each fly species exploits necrotic rot patches on the cactus for nutrients. The largest necrotic patch sizes rank in order from highest to lowest: cardon, saguaro, organpipe, and senita. The size and arm spans of the cacti did not influence the size of the necrotic patches. Instead of rot patch size being regulated by spatial factors, seasonal differences in the growth of the host plants determined how large and how abundant necrotic patches were. Further, temporal factors determined the amount of time a necrotic patch lasted; during the spring, patches are least abundant and during the summer, patches are most abundant.

While all other species of the four Sonoran Desert Drosophila showed a correlation between the resource richness of their hosts' necrotic patches and population size, no such distinct correlation was found for D. mettleri. D. mettleri exploits both necrotic patches and soil near rotting cacti; further, this species can thrive on a variety of hosts, leading to more dispersal of these flies under a given spatial region. The overall development periods and availability of host cacti strongly affects the growth of both larvae and the reproductive success of adults. For larvae, optimal host conditions entail long-lived necrotic plots as this gives the larvae enough time to grow and develop into larger, more fit adults. For adults, adequate conditions include hosts that grow more regularly because adults will have a regular site to lay eggs.

=== Defense mechanism ===
The host cacti contain toxic chemicals and compounds that otherwise prevent flies from feeding on cacti. D. mettleri contains genes that enable it to detoxify these toxic compounds and thus feed off of the cacti as a source of nutrients. These genes are linked to the evolution of xenobiotic resistance.

== Life history ==
The unique ability of D. mettleri to detoxify the high concentration of alkaloids present in the soil surrounding cacti with rot spots enables adult females to lay their eggs and sustain their larvae in the same nesting area. Other species of desert Drosophila that inhabit the same geographic region lack this ability and thus reduce the amount of competition females face in finding nesting sites. One species (D. majavensis) is composed of adults who cannot withstand the high alkaloid concentration in cacti soil unlike the larva that is only slightly sensitive. While this may encourage larval deposits to form in the soil, the inability of adult females to survive in these soil conditions prevents them from nesting in the soil, thus decreasing the amount of competition D. mettleri faces in finding appropriate nesting sites.

== Food resources ==
=== Rot material ===
Like other desert species of Drosophila, D. mettleri relies on the exudant juices of cacti as a feeding substrate. The juice found in the necrotic tissue of the cacti is also used as a feeding substrate when levels of exudates in the soil become low or scarce.

=== Yeast and bacteria ===
The area of the cactus often exploited by D. mettleri (when exudants are not extracted from soil) are "rot pockets". These pockets form when the cactus is injured; aggregates of bacteria and yeast conglomerate on the surface near the injury site and begin to form a pocket-like indent. The fermentation of the yeast and bacteria in this pocket serve as a "signal" to D. mettleri so that the site can be exploited for food.

Communities of yeast on host species of D. mettleri have been isolated and serve to decompose the host cacti. During mating, both sexes of the fly gift each other yeast and bacteria. This mixture is then placed on breeding sites, later exposing larvae to natural florae necessary in increasing their fitness.

== Mating ==
=== Courtship behavior ===
The courtship behaviors of desert Drosophila of the Eremophila complex are similar. D. mettleri, belonging to this complex, begin courting as soon as they have their first intrasexual contact. Once the male brushes against a female, courting begins and the male begins to follow the female. The male initiates in courtship song through vibration of his wings. The male will choose to either follow a side of the female or follow behind her. Depending on the spot the male decides to occupy will determine the vibrational frequency of the male's wings. The farther the male is to the female, the shorter the wing pulses are. When the female stops moving, vibrational frequency increases. During this courtship song, the male may choose to lick the genitals of the female. If the female chooses to accept a male during his courting song, the female's wings will expand and the male will terminate his song. The flies will begin to copulate soon after. In comparison to other species in the Eremophila complex, males of D. mettleri are more likely to force copulation with females.

=== Courtship song ===
The courting song of D. mettleri is characterized by distinct vibrational pulses and frequencies. The more mobile a female is, the more irregular the vibrational pulses of the male will be. To initiate the courting song, a male will extend his wings seventy-eighty degrees and release a few short pulses. After the initiation process, more regular pulses are released by males.

=== Male-female controls ===
In D. mettleri, after the male inserts his sperm (i.e. ejaculates) into his mate, swelling of the vaginal wall occurs. This may serve as a copulatory plug that serves as a defense against other males copulating and having offspring with the female. The male is then enabled to ensure his own paternity. This is an adaptation by the males of D. mettleri, as females of this species re-mate many times and will selectively fertilize her eggs. The copulatory plug has been shown to ensure paternity of the father, but there is no evidence of this plug serving any selection purposes.

6–8 hours after the insemination process occurs, a female will get rid of any excess sperm and the material that was used as a copulatory plug by her mate. This shows that both the male and females in the relationship have control over the sexual behaviors and outcomes of the opposite sex.

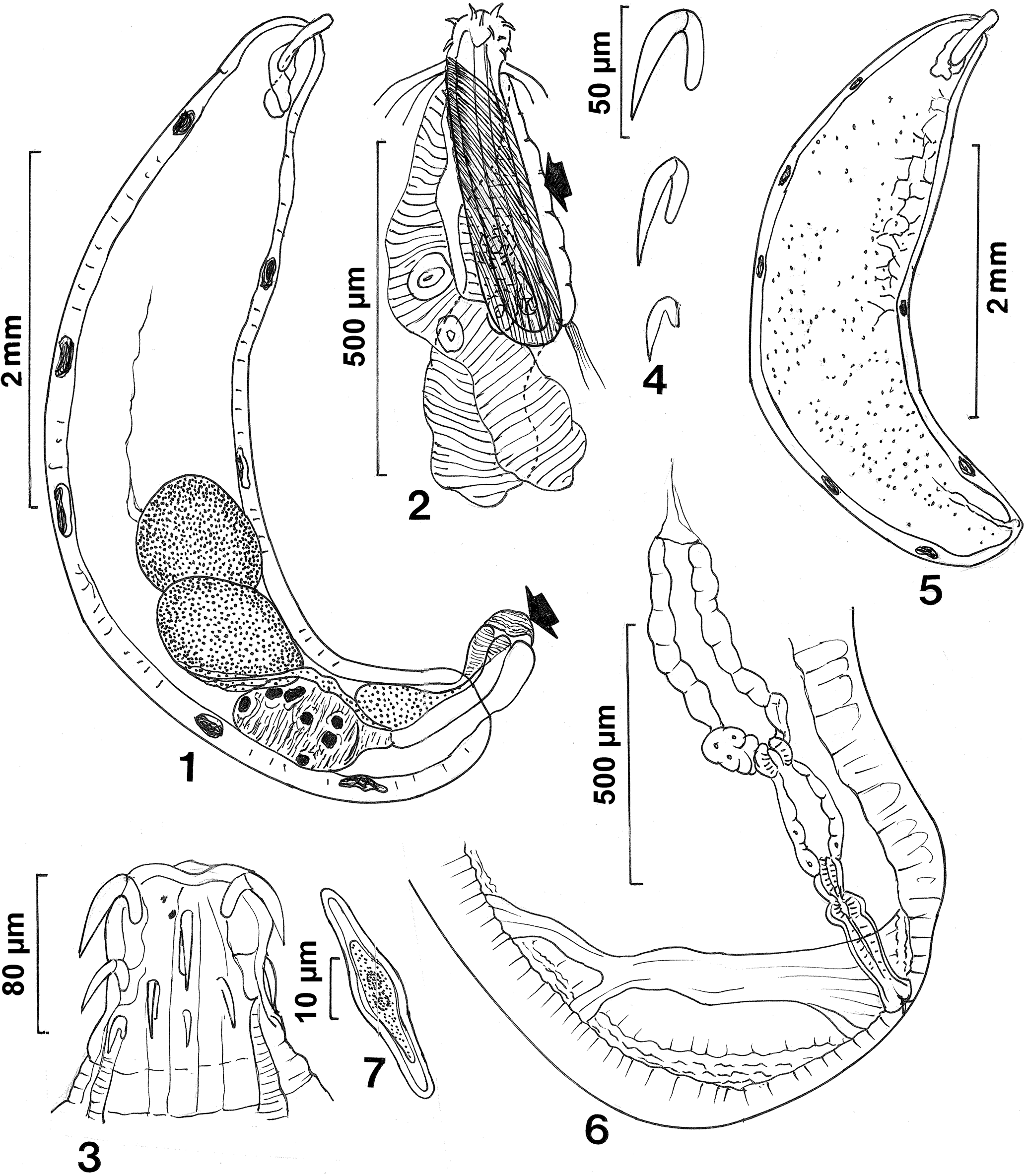
A sketch shows the reproductive architecture in a female fly.

==== Ejaculation material ====
The ejaculate material from the male serves a larger purpose than acting as a copulatory plug. The fluid may serve as a source of nutrients, and can also affect the time it takes for sperm activation to occur as well as the time of oviposition. The nutrients found in this fluid have been shown to increase egg size and to increase the quantity of eggs laid by the female (depending on the nutrient density of the fluid). Thus, the quality of this fluid limits or increases the female's reproductive success. The amount of fluid a male will contribute during a mating is dependent on the species of the Sonoran Desert drosophila. In D. mettleri, males make large ejaculatory investments when mating, and thus the male's fluid quality plays a large role in the development of the larvae.

=== Ejaculation nutrients' role in monogamy ===
The costs of having only one reproductive partner due to effects of the plug must be outweighed by the nutrient benefits gained by the ejaculated material. The cost to benefit trade-off is dependent upon resource availability and is highly regulated by the distribution and growth of rot material. In D. mettleri, there has been an evolutionary drive toward greater reproductive success of males donating the best quality and quantity of fluid. Radio-labeling was used to measure the amount of fluid incorporated into female egg production (and thus not removed from the body after 6–8 hours). They found that females with the largest vaginal swellings incorporated the highest amount of sperm from a single male partner than did females who had smaller vaginal swellings (and thus had the option to re-mate). Other Dipterans who do not have females undergoing an insemination process were also observed; no radio-labeled material was found in the eggs of these females, showing that the insemination process characteristic of D. mettleri and other Desert Drosophila is essential in male paternity assurance.

=== Not all are monogamous ===
A study published in 2012 did extensive research into the reproductive biology of D. mettleri and correlating information to its reproductive behaviors. Male flies mature more quickly than female flies do, but the study showed this is not the pivotal factor in why many wild females either lack sperm or exploit sperm sources too quickly once inseminated. The researchers concluded that the quick cycling of sperm in females explains why there may be frequent remating in this species both in the lab and in nature. The study also found that there were no consequences to life spans of females that had remated more than other females. In fact, a few benefits to multiple mating for females include greater female postcopulatory control of sperm and greater success of offspring.

== Parental care ==
=== Oviposition ===
As necrotrophs, these flies are known to lay their eggs in the rotting refuse of dying cacti. In comparison to other necrotrophs in the desert, D. mettleri prefers to breed in soils entrenched in the liquid of these rotting cacti rather than breeding in the tissues of cacti that contain these juices. The significance of this behavior is that the arid conditions of the desert lead to extreme water loss in the cacti, and resulting liquid toxins trailing into nearby soil is concentrated to a magnitude other nectrotrophs cannot detoxify. Thus, the detoxification capacity of D. mettleri enables it to breed in a niche environment not exploited commonly by other species.

The specialized detoxification abilities of D. mettleri have been tested in order to see if host-plant shifts would lead to changes on the genetic level in future offspring of flies exploiting cacti with different chemical compositions than those of their typical host cacti (senita and saguaro). Future generations showed transcriptional changes in genes triggering different metabolic pathways better equipped to detoxify the variant chemical environment of their host-cacti.

== Enemies ==
=== Parasites ===
Drosophila species, including D. mettleri and others in its phylogenetic lineage, show predatory pressure by ectoparasitic mites that live in the necrotic rotting spots on desert cacti. When D. mettleri feeds on these rots or breeds in these areas, they are parasitized by these mites which reduce their lifespans and hinder their reproduction abilities.

== Genetics ==
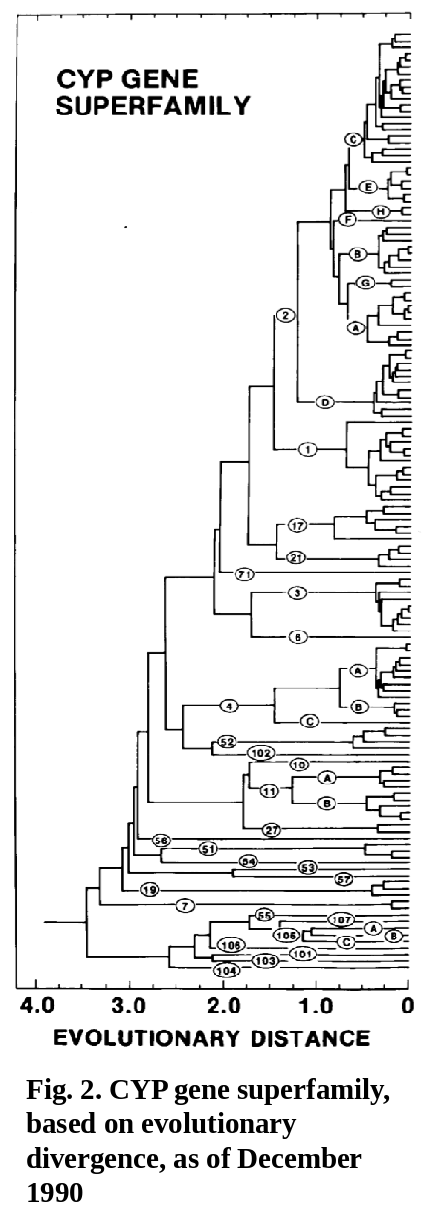
The diagram provides a visual of the CYP Gene superfamily and its evolutionary divergence.

=== P450 gene family and upregulation of CYP28A1 gene ===
To exploit the rotting liquid refuse of dying cacti, D. mettleri has been found to contain mutations leading to evolutionary adaptations. These mutations are thought to be the reason for the fly's xenobiotic resistance. Three families of genes, which include P450s, esterases, and glutathione s-transferases, contain the specific genes known to regulate the detoxification abilities of insects. The CYP28A1 gene has been isolated in lines of dipterans in the mettleri lineage and is upregulated in these flies. The upregulation of this gene is an adaptive response to exposure to toxic alkaloids in host plants. Similarly, the Cyp 28A1 gene expression is also upregulated in D. mettleri that are exposed to more alkaloids in host plants. The P450 family of genes have a protein structure that can be highly altered by few mutations and sequence changes. A site in the Cyp 28A1 gene has a single change from a nonpolar to polar amino acid. This alteration is enough to lead to an up-regulation in gene expression causing a significant change in physical protein structure; the consequence is increased detoxification of toxins in host plants within the D. mettleri tested.

=== Genetic isolation between species ===
A new model studies genetic isolation between species of cactophillic Diptera (D. mettleri and D. mojavensis) on the Catalina Islands off the Californian coast. The flies of these species have switched host plants to prickly pear cacti on these islands, and genetic differences have also been isolated in these flies. After comparing the genotypes of these species on the Catalina islands to other flies that use prickly pear cacti as their hosts, haplotype relationships among D. mettleri and D. mojavensis were found. In conclusion, the study found that the geographical barrier of the San Pedro Channel found between the Catalina Islands caused genetic isolation and that there was ecological factors that lead to genetic differences in those flies of D. mettleri and D. mojavensis feeding on prickly pear on the Catalina islands.

== Physiology ==
=== Thermoregulation ===
Different species of Drosophila will exploit different species of cacti; the host species regularly inhabited by D. mettleri has been shown to determine the thermotolerance differences within this species of fly, despite their geographical dispersal overlap. Species of cacti that are larger and store more water, like the cardon and saguaro cactus, are able to retain cooler internal temperatures during periods of intense heat. Species like the senita are smaller and carry less water; they are prone to reaching higher temperatures in arid climates. D. mettleri is found most commonly near saguaro and senita cacti, characterizing their lower heat tolerance levels than other species of desert Drosophila. The differences in species distribution among host cacti is linked to the physiological differences in the flies on the basis of their detoxification efficiency of the toxins naturally found in the varying cacti species. D. mettleri contains the transcriptional changes needed to detoxify the more cool and temperate environment of the saguaro and cardon cactus. Over time, less necessity to inhabit hotter cacti reduced the genes selecting for higher heat tolerance.

== Mutualism ==
=== Host rot plot exploitation ===
Other species of desert Drosophila can exploit the substrates of the desert cacti species saguaro and cardon. D. mettleri is one of two species of nine that can use the juices of the senita cactus as food. Alkaloids in cacti are highly toxic to most Drosophila and to the development of larva. Components leading to the toxicity of desert cacti include medium fatty acid chains, dihydroxy sterols, and senita alkaloids. Some species of Drosophila can withstand these chemical conditions within the cacti when breeding but at the consequence of the survival of larvae. D. mettleri is one of two species where the toxicity of the cacti (specifically the senita) does not reduce the survival rates of larvae and pupa, and has little effect on the mother's survival.

=== Mutualism role in nesting area choice ===
Despite the distinct ability of D. mettleri to breed successfully in both the necrotic tissue of desert cacti and soil moisturized with the exudates of rotting cacti, the species has a behavioral preference to breed in the soil habitat where conditions are cooler and where there is less predatory pressure.
