= CYP28A1 =

Insect gene

Cytochrome P450 monooxygenase CYP28A1

Identifiers
- Organism: Drosophila mettleri (Fruit fly)
- Symbol: Cyp28a1
- Orthologs: OMA: entry
- UniProt: O46221
Search for
- Structures: Swiss-model
- Domains: InterPro

CYP28A1 is an insect gene belongs to the cytochrome P450 family, first found in Drosophila mettleri (Fruit fly), involved in the detoxification of plant alkaloids.
