= International Reviews of Immunology =

- Discipline: Immunology
- Language: English
- Edited by: Rupak Dey Sarkar

Publication details
- History: 1986-present
- Publisher: Informa Healthcare (United States)
- Frequency: 8/year
- Impact factor: 3.481 (2019)

Standard abbreviations
- ISO 4: Int. Rev. Immunol.

Indexing
- ISSN: 1563-5244

Links
- Journal homepage

International Reviews of Immunology is an international peer-reviewed medical journal that covers basic and translational research in immunology and related fields.

== Editor ==
The editor in chief of International Reviews of Immunology is Dr. Himanshu Kumar (Indian Institute of Science Education and Research, Bhopal, India; WPI Immunology Frontier Research Center, Osaka University, Osaka, Japan).
