= Behavioral immune system =

Psychological mechanisms against disease

The behavioral immune system is a phrase coined by the psychological scientist Mark Schaller to refer to a suite of psychological mechanisms that allow individual organisms to detect the potential presence of infectious parasites or pathogens in their immediate environment, and to engage in behaviors that prevent contact with those objects and individuals.

The existence of a behavioral immune system has been documented across many animal species, including humans. It is theorized that the mechanisms that comprise the behavioral immune system evolved as a crude first line of defense against disease-causing pathogens.

In humans and animals, activating a physiological immune response to pathogens is effective, but metabolically costly. Immune responses are activated at the expense of other fitness enhancing activities. Inflammation after infection can also be harmful to the body (e.g., contribute to diseases of aging). In addition to cultural adaptations to avoid pathogens, the behavioral immune system acts as a set of defense mechanisms to protect against pathogens before infection occurs

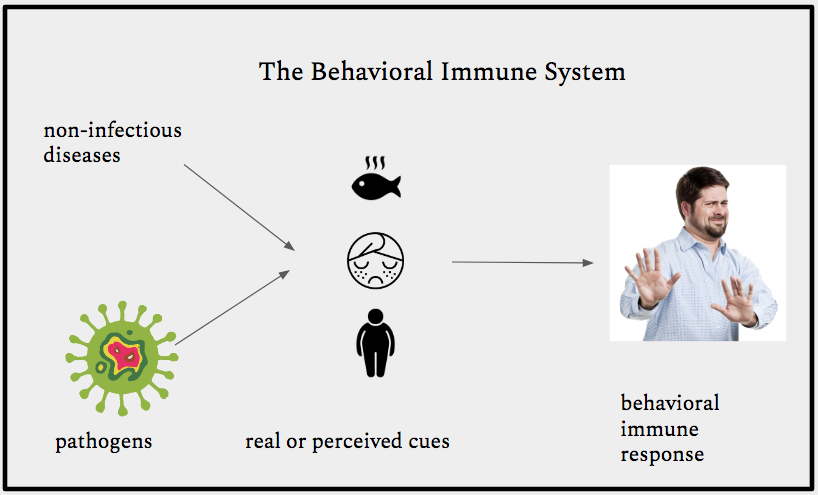
Shows pathogens and non-infection diseases that create similar cues connoting presence of pathogens, real or perceived, which activate the behavioral immune system

== Proximate mechanisms ==
Mechanisms for the behavioral immune system include sensory processes through which cues connoting the presence of parasitic infections are perceived (e.g., the smell of a foul odor, the sight of pox or pustules), as well as stimulus–response systems through which these sensory cues trigger a cascade of aversive affective, cognitive, and behavioral reactions (e.g., arousal of disgust, automatic activation of cognitions that connote the threat of disease, behavioral avoidance).

=== Sensory components ===
Early and current research on behavioral immune system activation has been focused on visual cues or triggers that elicit responses. However, recent work suggests that other sensory modalities may be at work for disease detection.

==== Smell ====
Studies show that olfactory cues of disease elicit disgust and predict pathogen avoidance behaviors. In humans, body odors from diseased individuals are rated less desirable and likeable, and perceived as unhealthier, more intense, and less pleasant. Disgust of body odors is also influenced by the closeness of the source of odor. Odors from family members are rated as less disgusting than body odors from strangers. Experimental studies showed that the presence of aversive odors leads to more prophylactic behaviors, such as more willing condom use and less-direct prophylactic behaviors, like stricter punishment for moral violations.

A new body of work has linked olfactory acuity to disgust and behavioral immune system responses. Given that olfactory cues for pathogen threat are often ambiguous and overgeneralized, a better ability to detect smells would lead to better pathogen avoidance. Recent work suggests that higher olfactory acuity may be associated with higher avoidance motivation.

==== Taste ====
Gustatory stimuli, particularly of spoiled foods, elicit feels of disgust and motivate pathogen avoidance behavior. People with more disgust sensitivity are predicted to have more aversion to novel or foreign foods.

==== Sight and touch ====
Visual cues of pathogen threat have been linked to increases in tactile sensitivity and lead to perceived people with accents as more foreign, especially among individuals with higher disgust sensitivity. Disgust sensitivity among individuals is also predictive of preferred amount of personal space.

==== Overgeneralization ====
The "smoke detector principle" of evolved systems that regulate protective responses has also been used to describe the behavioral immune systems tendency to overgeneralize. Evolved responses to signals of pathogen threat cannot be perfect and rely on liberal identification criteria. This makes the behavioral immune system susceptible to activating when pathogens are absent. Noninfectious physical and mental abnormalities including elderly appearance, disabilities, obesity, and disfigurement can act as cues of pathogen presence, when none are present. Even though many false alarms may be triggered in response to these nonharmful cues, the costs associated with behavioral immune activation may be relatively small to the costs of missing a true disease threat.

	Respond "Absent"	Respond "Present"
Stimulus Present	Miss	Hit
Stimulus Absent	Correct Rejection	False Alarm

Table taken from signal detection theory (SDT). Cues, such as foul smell, that activate the behavioral immune system, such as the emotion of disgust, can have stimulus present (real pathogen threat) or absent (perceived pathogen threat).

=== Responses ===
==== Disgust ====
The pathogen disgust system and the behavioral immune system have been studied separately, but there is recognition that they are functionally the same. Darwin first recognized that the emotion of disgust aided in avoiding "tainted" food. The emotion of disgust has now been recognized as an adaptive function for avoiding pathogen exposure in response to cues of potential pathogen threat. However, disgust to pathogen-related cues should be context-dependent to function adaptively. In one study on the Shuar, an indigenous subsistence-based population with high-pathogen stress, pathogen disgust sensitivity (PDS), measured with a disgust questionnaire, was used to predict pathogen infection. The study found that individual PDS was negatively correlated with pathogen infection predictive of the hypothesis that disgust acts as a pathogen defense mechanism sensitive to local costs and benefits of avoidance and infection.

==== Functional flexibility ====
Functional flexibility is a term used to describe the ability of the behavioral immune system to adjust responses to pathogens depending on the individual's infection-related threat and infection-relating vulnerability. Like many evolved threat management systems, the behavioral immune system is sensitive to the costs and benefits of pathogen avoidance.

==== Reactive and proactive ====
Two categories of outputs can be generated by the behavioral immune system; reactive and proactive responses Reactive responses occur in response to the presence of cues connoting an immediate infection risk. The responses generally take the form of avoidant or prophylactic behaviors. These can include restricted sexual attitudes, positivity towards condom use, and avoidance of people with cues associated with illness.

Proactive responses occur in response to the long-term and persistent threat of pathogens. Across species, proactive management of pathogen threat can be seen in hygiene behaviors to mitigate reoccurring bacterial and viral threats. Additionally, proactive responses can be seen in the importance placed on a potential mate's physical attractiveness, symmetry, and secondary sex-characteristics which are all indicators of health, and healthy people are less likely to carry disease.

== Influences on social psychology ==
Two social consequences of activating the behavioral immune system according to Ackerman et al., are "1. increased aversion and avoidance of unfamiliar and outgroup targets and 2. strengthened cohesion with familiar and ingroup targets."

=== Interpersonal perception ===
Interpersonal perception is influenced by the behavioral immune system due to the early stage cognitive processes recruited for identifying pathogenic threat and the risks associated with interpersonal contagion.

Visual attention is one these early cognitive process recruited toward cues of pathogen threat and perceivers find it more difficult to visually disengage from faces possessing these cues, like physical abnormalities, even if no threat is present .

The behavioral immune system may also cause people who perceive greater pathogen threat to report greater distinctions between ingroup and outgroup members, and classify strangers as more threatening.

=== Judgment and decision-making ===
Judgments, inferences, and decisions about people and objects are other cognitive processes recruited by the behavioral immune system that are affected by pathogen threat. These processes motivative choices that help perceivers avoid unfamiliar stimuli that may include contamination dangers.

Examples of the influence perceived pathogen threat has on these processes include: avoidance of controllable risk, reduced desire for social affiliation, and devaluation of consumer products previously handled by strangers.

Additional lines of research on the behavioral immune system have shown that people engage in more reticent and conservative forms of behavior under conditions in which they feel more vulnerable to disease transmission. For instance, when the potential threat of disease is made salient, people tend to be less extraverted or sociable.

=== Close relationships ===
The behavioral immune system influences potential mating choices and sexual behavior. High concern for chronic pathogen threats and environments with greater pathogen stress increase the value an individual places on physical attractiveness, and lessens preference for mates with physical abnormality or sex-divergent features. Among perceivers, cues of pathogen prevalence (real or perceived) are associated with more restricted sexual pursuits and attitudes to avoid infection. Opposite, more sexual opportunism is found in individuals with perceived insufficient immune systems for survival in environments with higher pathogen stress.

=== Stereotyping and prejudice ===
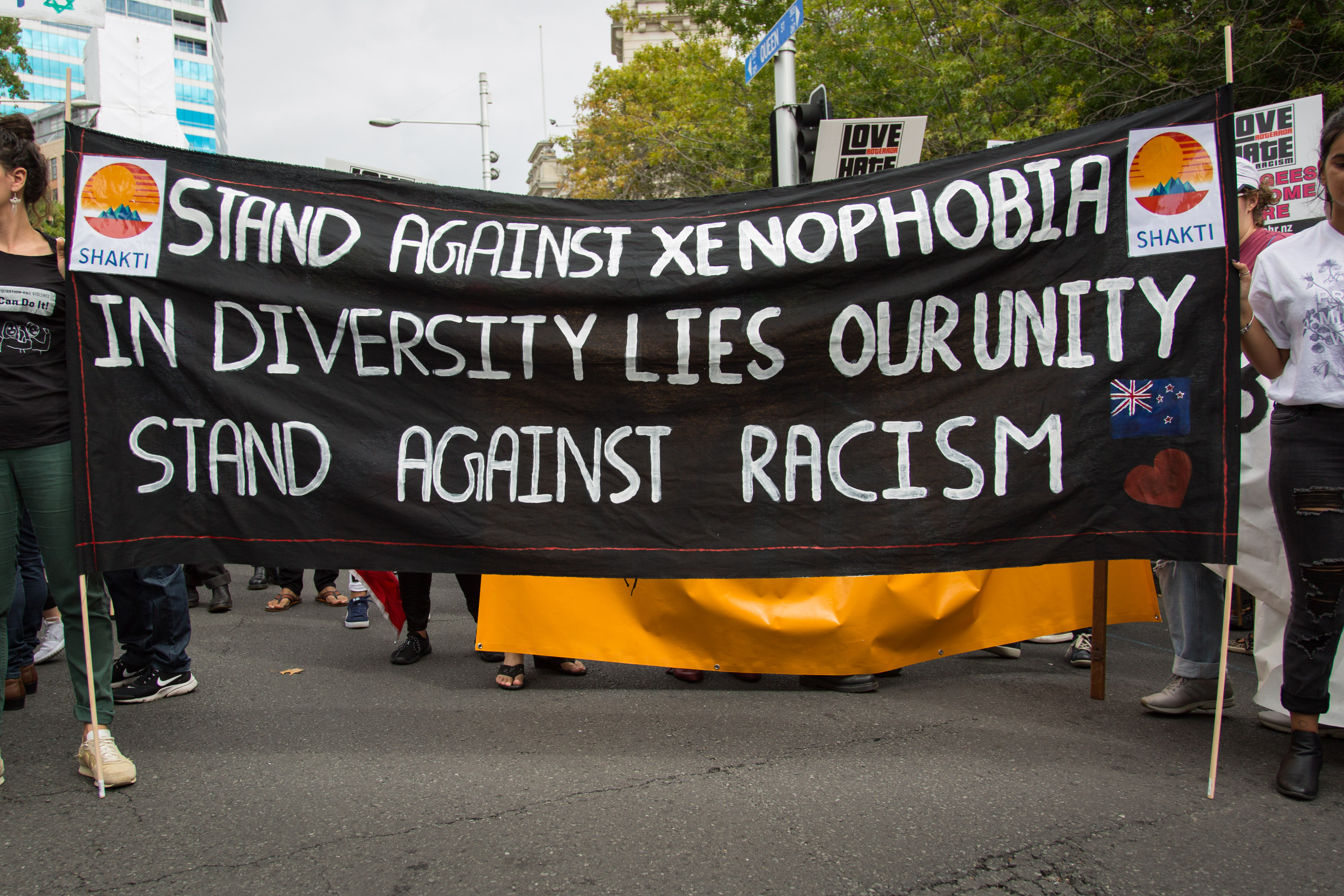
Xenophobia is defined by Oxford languages as: dislike of or prejudice against people from other countries. Some studies indicate behavioral immune activation may lead to greater in-group preference and prejudice towards out-groups.

Another outcome of behavioral immune system activity is prejudice and stereotyping of outgroup members. Individuals at higher risk of pathogen infection are more likely to stigmatize other individuals possessing cues of disease, real or perceived.

The disease–avoidant processes that characterize the behavioral immune system have been shown to contribute to prejudices against obese individuals, elderly individuals, and people with physical disfigurements or disabilities. In addition, the behavioral immune system appears to contribute to xenophobia and ethnocentrism. This can be seen among pregnant women, which face higher infection-related vulnerability, that express an increase ethnocentric views. These attitudes might function as a way to avoid people with new pathogens or practices that local practices are unsuited to manage. One implication is that these prejudices tend to be exaggerated under conditions in which people feel especially vulnerable to the potential transmission of infectious diseases.

=== Group processes and cultural norms ===
The behavioral immune system has the ability to impact group intragroup attitudes and behaviors. Research shows that pathogen stress is associated with higher social conformity and higher levels of disgust, which aids in pathogen avoidance and predictive of greater sensitivity to moral violations.

Some studies have used the behavioral immune system to explain the root of more fundamental dimensions of culture including the variance in: individualism/collectivism, social and political orientation, and religious beliefs, in response to levels of pathogen stress.

Collectivist cultures defined by behavioral manifestations such as ethnocentrism and social conformity which aid in pathogen avoidance, have been correlated with higher historical pathogen stress compared to individualistic cultures. Given that there might be benefits associated with individualistic cultures in the societies they create, individualist cultures also confer greater pathogen exposure. In environments with greater pathogen stress, the behavioral manifestations of collectivism that help avoid pathogens may serve an adaptive advantage.

=== Critiques of in-group preference ===
In-group preferences defined by the degree to which people prefer interacting with and investing in family, friends, and in group members has been suggested to be a function of the behavioral immune system in order to defend against pathogens. However, these studies on cross-population level data have been criticized for not incorporating non-independence variables and alternative hypotheses. In a follow up study, using measures the same measure for in-group preference, Hofstede's collectivism, Van de Vliert's in-group favoritism, and Fincher and Thornhill's strength of family ties, find that less government effectiveness is a better predictor of in-group preference than pathogen stress.

== Implications for immunology ==
=== Complimentary ===
Some research suggests that the behavioral immune system has implications for the functioning of the physiological immune system (PIS) too. One study found that the mere visual perception of diseased-looking people stimulated white blood cells to respond more aggressively to infection (as indicated by the production of the proinflammatory cytokine Interleukin 6 in response to a bacterial stimulus).

In other studies, exposure to visual environmental pathogen cues, in addition to increased feelings of disgust and prejudice responses associated with the behavioral immune system (BIS), upregulate oral and blood immune inflammatory biomarkers. This body of literature suggests that visual cues connected to the BIS may invoke PIS responses when pathogen threat is immediate.

=== Compensatory ===
In the absence of an immediate pathogen threat, the PIS and BIS may not be complimentary, but compensatory. For example, in an experiment that stimulated release of proinflammatory cytokines (IL-6, IL-1b, TNF-alpha) collected from healthy individuals, were not related to self-reported germ aversion, but in-vivo IL-6 levels were negatively correlated to germ aversion and perceived longevity. This research may highlight the function of the BIS for long-term health by decreasing proinflammatory responses (function of IL-6), linked to diseases of aging.

Research also indicates that immune-relevant interventions which target pathogen transmission can interrupt behavioral responses. For example, receiving a flu vaccination or washing one's hands can reduce the extent of negative interpersonal and intergroup attitudes elicited by disease cues and concerns.

== Sickness behavior ==
The large body of literature on the behavioral immune system is focused on behaviors triggered by pathogen cues in the environment and the role disgust plays in mitigating exposure before infection. However, the emotion associated with being sick, lassitude, that is triggered by an active infection may also act as behavioral defense mechanism against pathogens. One study suggests that lassitude may help fight against an active infection by:

- reducing energetically expensive movement to make more energy available to the immune system.
- reducing exposure to additional infections and injuries that would increase the immune systems' workload.
- promoting thermoregulatory behaviors that facilitate immunity.
- regulating food consumption to be beneficial for the host but detrimental to pathogens.
- deploying strategies that elicit caregiving behavior from social allies.

== COVID-19 ==
The behavioral immune system's prediction of ingroup favoritism and ethnocentric beliefs has been applied to individual beliefs during the global pandemic, COVID-19. In several studies, individuals who scored higher in dispositional worry about disease reported stronger preference for restrictive travel bans on several regions of Asia. One study found that as COVID-19 cases increased, individuals reported higher concern about contracting the virus and showed greater levels of Right-Wing Authoritarianism, including conservatism and traditionalism. Experimental increase of pandemic salience also increased support of travel bans on high risk nation (China and Italy), but not on low risk nations like Canada and Mexico. Another study measuring individual perceived vulnerability to disease (PVD) and responses to COVID-19 found that higher PVD was positively associated with stronger reactions to the threat of COVID-19, including increased anxiety, perceptions that people should alter their typical behavior, and self-reported importance of social distancing.
