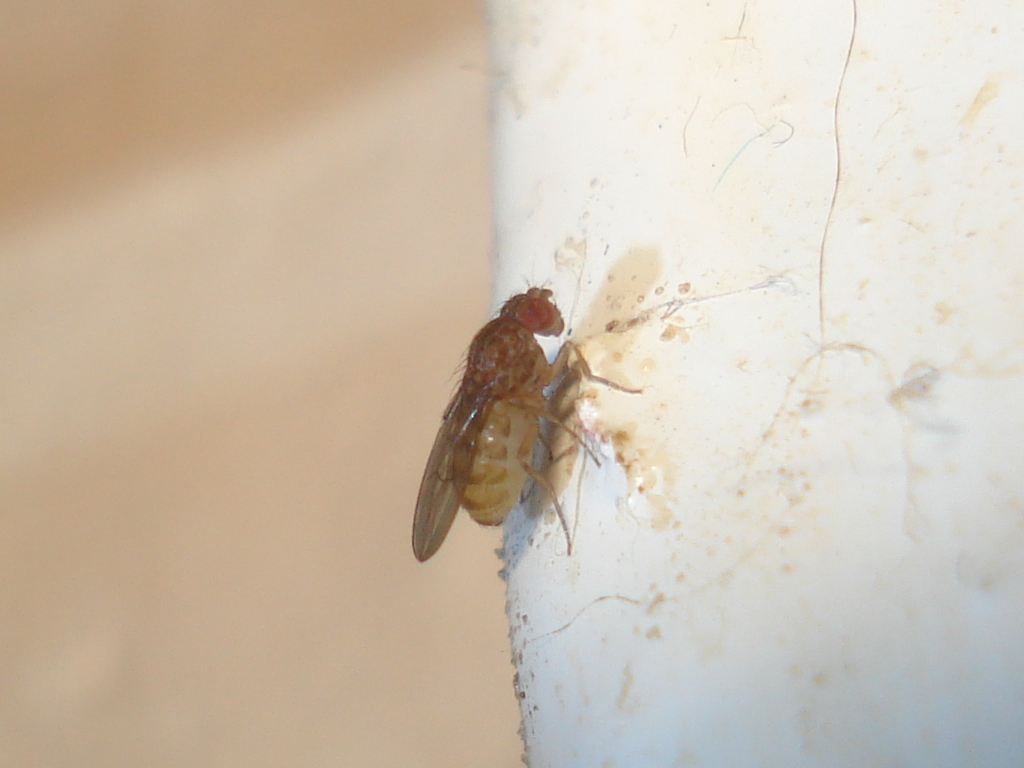

Scientific classification
- Kingdom: Animalia
- Phylum: Arthropoda
- Class: Insecta
- Order: Diptera
- Family: Drosophilidae
- Genus: Drosophila
- Species: D. repleta

Binomial name
- Drosophila repleta Wollaston, 1858

Synonyms
- Drosophila melanopalpa Patterson and Wheeler, 1942

= Drosophila repleta =

Species of fly

Drosophila repleta is a species of vinegar fly in the family Drosophilidae.

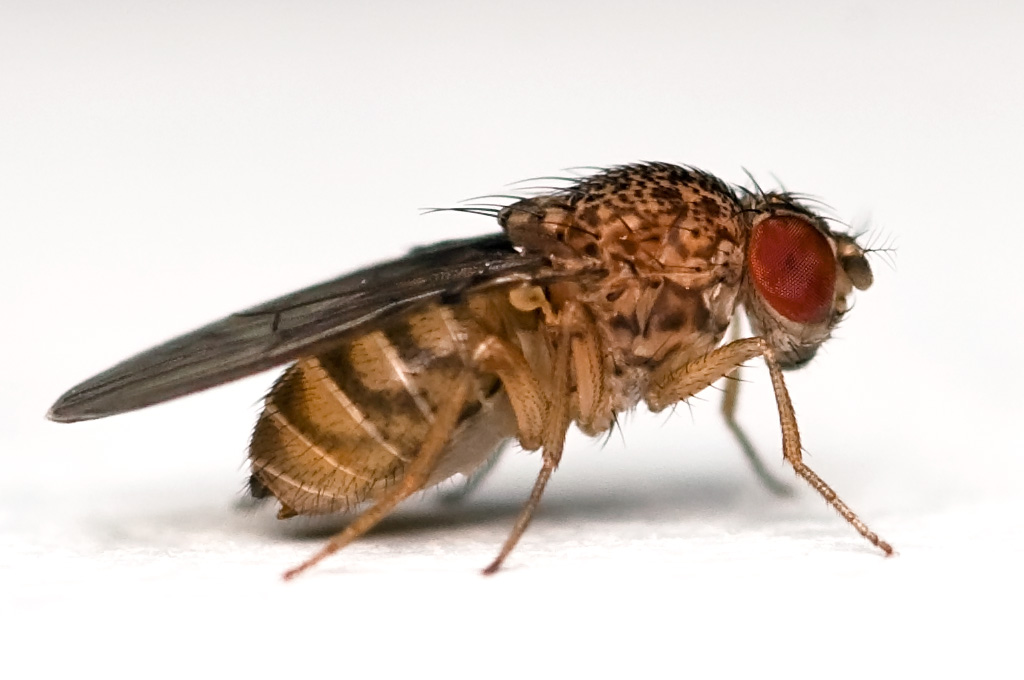

D. repleta is a subtropical species, and is well adapted to warm, urbanized environments. D. repleta is a carrier of foodborne illness - including Escherichia coli O157:H7, Salmonella Saint Paul, and Listeria innocua - onto human food.
