= Pathogen avoidance =

Disgust response that guides human behavior

Pathogen avoidance (also parasite avoidance or pathogen disgust) refers to the theory that the disgust response, in humans, is an adaptive system that guides behavior to avoid infection caused by parasites such as viruses, bacteria, fungi, protozoa, helminth worms, arthropods and social parasites. Pathogen avoidance is a psychological mechanism associated with the behavioral immune system. Pathogen avoidance has been discussed as one of the three domains of disgust which also include sexual and moral disgust.

== Evolutionary significance ==
In nature, controlling or the avoidance of pathogens is an essential fitness strategy because disease-causing agents are ever-present. Pathogens reproduce rapidly at the expense of their hosts' fitness, this creates a coevolutionary arms race between pathogen transmission and host avoidance. For a pathogen to move to a new host, it must exploit regions of the body that serve as points of contact between current and future hosts such as the mouth, the skin, the anus and the genitals. To avoid the cost of infection, organisms require counteradaptations to prevent pathogen transmission, by defending entry points such as the mouth and skin and avoiding other individual's exit points and the substances exiting these points such as feces and sneeze droplets. Pathogen avoidance provides the first line of defense by physically avoiding conspecifics, other species, objects or locations that could increase vulnerability to pathogens.

The pathogen avoidance theory of disgust predicts that behavior that reduces contact with pathogens, will have been under strong selection throughout the evolution of free-living organisms and should be prevalent throughout the Animalia kingdom. Compared to the alternative, facing the infectious threat, avoidance likely provides a reduction in exposure to pathogens and in energetic costs associated with activation of the physiological immune response. These behaviors are found throughout the animal literature, particularly amongst social animals.

== Mechanism ==
In humans, the disgust responses are the primary mechanism for avoiding infection through behavior triggered by sensory cues. Tybur argues that pathogen disgust requires two psychological mechanisms: detection systems that recognize input cues associated with the presence of pathogens and integration systems that weigh cue-based pathogen threats with other fitness relevant factors and generate withdrawal or avoidance behaviors appropriately.

The genetic underpinnings of these neural mechanisms are to date, not well understood. There is some evidence to suggest that humans are capable of detecting visual and olfactory sickness cues before overt cues for the disgust response are produced.

=== Cues ===
Pathogens are typically too small to be directly observed and so require the presence of observable cues that tend to co-occur with them. These inputs take the form of recognizable cues.

- Hygiene: The detection of displays of or physical evidence of unhygienic behavior.
- Animals or Insect: Typically, animal or insect disease vectors such as mice or mosquitoes.
- Sex: Behavior related to promiscuity of sexual activities
- Atypical appearance: Infection cues in other individuals such as abnormal body shape, deformity, auditory cues such as coughing and contextual cues related to circumstances of increased risk of infection such as homelessness.
- Lesions: Stimuli related to signs of infection on the surface of the body such as blisters, boils or pus.
- Food: Food items with visible or olfactory signs of spoilage.

=== Computational structure model ===
Tybur proposed a model of how an information processing system might be structured. In this model, perceptual systems (vision, olfaction, etc.) monitor the environment for cues to pathogens. Then, a mechanism integrates cues from the different perceptual systems and estimates a pathogen index, an internal estimation of the probability that pathogens are present based on reliability and detection of cues. Finally context-dependent avoidance can only occur if additional information is taken as input- if other mechanisms exist that function to trade off pathogen presence against other fitness-impacting dimensions across various contexts. The expected value of contact is a downstream index that integrates other indices relevant to the costs and benefits of contact which then regulates the approach versus avoidance in an adaptive manner. This model is consistent with several empirical findings of how additional variables such as sexual value, nutrient status, kinship status, hormonal status and immune function also influence responses to pathogen cues.

=== Imperfections in pathogen detection ===
Signaling detection errors are prevalent in the pathogen avoidance system; there are two types of errors: a false alarm, where a pathogen avoidance response is deployed needlessly or a miss, where a pathogen avoidance was not deployed in the presence of infection risk, they depend on whether pathogens are present or not. The costs for not mounting an avoidance response in the presence of infection risk is assumed to be greater, suggesting that selection may be favoring a greater sensitivity to cue pathogens at the expense of specificity. This is thought to explain the law of contagion wherein, objects in contact with an infectious cue are themselves treated as infectious.

== Pathogen counter-adaptations ==
Hosts and parasites are under reciprocal evolutionary selection for hosts to acquire adaptations to prevent pathogen transmission and pathogens to acquire traits to evade host defense, this is known as host-parasite coevolution.

=== Parasite manipulation of host behavior ===
Many parasitic species manipulate the behavior if their hosts in order to increase the probability of transmission and completion of a parasite's lifecycle, these are sometimes referred to as behavior-altering parasites. This is a widespread adaptive strategy that increases fitness benefits for the parasite. Parasites can affect host behavior in multiple ways by altering host activity, the host's microenvironment or both. A comparison across host and parasite taxa revealed that vertebrates that were infected were more likely to have impaired reaction to predators as a result of manipulation while infection in invertebrates lead to increase in the host coming in contact with predators.

== Known factors of influence ==
=== Sex ===
Women consistently demonstrate higher disgust sensitivity than men. Evidence suggests that women respond more sensitively to disease threats than men. This is hypothesized to be consistent with the enhanced evolutionary role in women for protecting their offspring.

=== Sexual behavior ===
Sexual behavior with another individual, such as intercourse is a major source of pathogenic risk particularly for bacterial or viral infection. Research has found a negative relationship between sexual arousal and disgust, indicating that when sexual arousal increases disgust responses decrease. Additional evidence points to variation in pathogen avoidance traits and their relationship with sexual behavior. Individuals with high trait-level pathogen avoidance are less motivated to have sex with multiple partners. This suggests that individuals with a more active behavioral immune system might perceive the costs of sexual activity with multiple partners as higher than those with a less active behavioral immune system.

=== Terrestrial versus aquatic environments ===
Distinct properties of parasite transmission of aquatic and terrestrial ecosystems lead to differences in the avoidance behaviors in these environments, however, the mechanisms are quite similar. For example, marine parasites are estimated to spread at a rate two times faster than terrestrial counterparts due to a combination of the increased viscosity and density of seawater and the movement of water through tides and currents.

=== Political ideology ===
Researchers have suggested that elements of a conservative political orientation function to reduce individual exposure to infectious agents. These studies found that the relationship between pathogen avoidance and social conservatism was statistically robust. Multiple mechanisms have been proposed as pathogen-neutralizing aspects of conservatism such as in-group favoritism, cultural evolution favoring pathogen-neutralizing traditions and rituals, and advocating for tradition-adherence within a community. There is criticism of this association. Tybur argues that the relationship between social conservatism and pathogen avoidance is explained by sexual strategies associated with conservatism, such as orientation towards monogamous sexual strategies. Another study, suggests that a generalized response to social resources is a more plausible mechanism underlying in-group favoritism than adaptations to pathogen stress.

== Non-human animal behaviors ==
As parasite avoidance is a selective pressure imposed on all living animals, there are commonalities in strategies, mechanisms and consequences of pathogen avoidance behavior across species.

=== Vertebrates ===
==== Mammals ====
Asian elephants (Elephas maximus) use branches to deter biting flies from areas of the body with thinner skin or that cannot be easily reached.

Rats use their saliva which possesses bactericidal properties, to protect themselves and potential mating partners from genital pathogens by licking their genitalia after copulation. Wood rats (Neotoma fuscipes) exhibit a unique behavior of placing bay leaves (Umbellularia californica) in or near their nest to prevent flea infestations. Canids will defecate and urinate away from the proximity of their dens to protect against oro-faecally transmitted parasites Newborns who cannot exit the den, will have fresh excreta consumed by their mothers, as parasitic ova take several days to hatch thus preventing infection.

Mice avoid sick conspecifics. The detection of cues associated with disease is mediated by an olfactory subsystem - the vomeronasal organ.

==== Primates ====
Bonobos rely on visual, tactile and olfactory cues to determine contamination risk when presented with contaminated food items versus the uncontaminated control group. Mandrills engage in allo-grooming practices in which they avoid members of the same species with parasitic infection and rely on the smell of feces of conspecifics infected with parasites to discriminate those individuals. Evidence has shown that both chimpanzees and Japanese macaques (Macaca fuscata) engage in food washing to remove food soiled with bodily fluids and dirt as a contaminant avoidance behavior strategy.

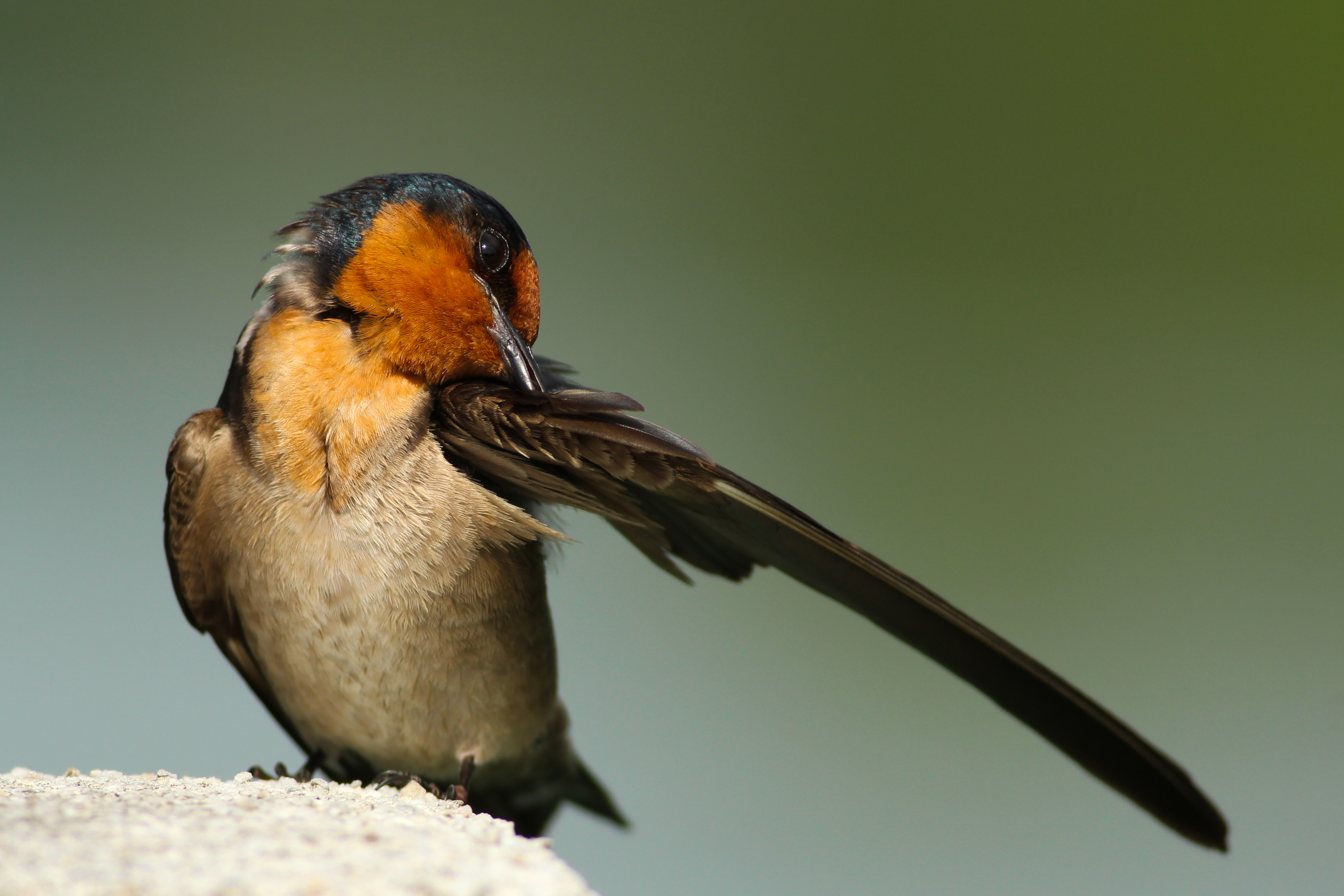
Bird preening its feathers.

==== Birds ====
Birds engage in body maintenance, nest maintenance, avoidance of parasitized prey, migration and toleration as ectoparasite avoidance behavior. These anti-parasite behaviors are central to bird hygiene. For example, birds preen to straighten and clean feathers but this also is used as a method to remove ectoparasites in their plumage.

=== Invertebrates ===
==== Crustaceans ====
Social lobsters engage in specialized den selection by preferentially choosing dens with uninfected lobsters over dens with lobsters infected with the PaV1 virus.

==== Insects ====
Bees have several steps to avoid parasitic invasion of a colony; avoidance parasite contact, recognition of parasites and subsequent rejection, and the avoidance of social parasite exploitation. Within the colony, parasitic avoidance include: having several queens, nest construction that prevents invasion, chemical cues, coordinated defense. In the event of parasitic invasion of a colony, bees resort to hygienic behavior defense as a last resort effort against parasite infection in which infected, dying and already dead bodies are removed from the nest.

==== Nematodes ====
The most comprehensive data on avoidance behaviors has been generated for C. elegans. They protect themselves from unfavorable effects of pathogenic bacteria by avoiding lawns on which Microbacterium nematophilum is found. Evidence suggests that C. elegans relies on its olfactory system for pathogen avoidance, by avoiding odors that mimic those infected by pathogenic bacterium. Genetic analysis has revealed three mechanisms involved in avoidance behavior: learning of pathogen avoidance based on G-protein signaling in chemosensory neurons, learning of pathogen avoidance behavior through serotonin signaling pathways, physical avoidance and reduced oral uptake of pathogens.

== Medical implications ==
A study has suggested that the four pillars of human medicine: quarantine, medication, immunization and nursing or caring are extensions of behavioral defenses against pathogens seen in animals. Hart argues that more complex applications of pathogen avoidance behaviors seen in medicine can be attributed to advanced linguistic and cognitive capabilities and higher rates of sickness in humans compared to animals.
