= Mark Schaller =

American psychologist

Mark Schaller (born November 27, 1962) is an American psychologist who has made many contributions to the study of human behavior and cognition, particularly in areas of social cognition, stereotyping, evolutionary psychology, and cultural psychology. He is a professor of psychology at the University of British Columbia.

Schaller was born on November 27, 1962, in Palo Alto, California. His father is the zoologist and animal conservationist George Schaller. During his childhood he lived in India, Pakistan, and Tanzania, as well as in the United States. He graduated from the University of North Carolina in 1984 and obtained a PhD in psychology at Arizona State University in 1989, mentored by Robert Cialdini. Early in his academic career he held faculty positions at the University of Texas at Arlington and at the University of Montana. In 1996 he moved to his current position at the University of British Columbia.

== Research ==
Much of Schaller's psychological research has examined the subtle cognitive processes that contribute to stereotypes and prejudices. One line of research focused on intuitive statistical reasoning processes. This work revealed that people form erroneous stereotypes when they engage in overly simplistic statistical reasoning, but that these erroneous stereotypes are less likely to emerge if people can be trained to engage in a more sophisticated reasoning process (analogous to a statistical analysis of covariance). Another line of research focused on communication processes as they relate to the emergence and change of group stereotypes. Additional lines of research, informed by the adaptationist reasoning characteristic of evolutionary psychology, focused on the ways in which specific kinds of perceived threats (e.g., threat of interpersonal violence), and contextual cues connoting vulnerability to those threats (e.g., ambient darkness), trigger specific kinds of prejudices against specific categories of people.

Within his program of research on threats and prejudices, Schaller developed a broader line of research on the perceived threat of infectious disease and its implications for psychological functioning. In this context, he coined the term "behavioral immune system" to refer to a suite of evolved psychological mechanisms that serve as a crude first line of defense against infectious diseases. The behavioral immune system includes sensory mechanisms that allow people to detect the presence of pathogens in objects (including people) in their immediate environment, as well as stimulus-response mechanisms that trigger aversive affective, cognitive, and behavioral reactions to those things (and persons). Schaller and his colleagues, as well as other behavioral scientists, have documented many implications that the behavioral immune system has for emotion, for prejudice, for human social cognition and social behavior more generally, for the origins of cross-cultural differences, and for actual immunological functioning.

Schaller has also published scientific research on a variety of other topics pertaining to human psychological functioning. These topics include: the implications of evolutionary fundamental human motives on social behavior, the psychology of kin recognition, and the psychological consequences of fame.

== Books ==
- Schaller, M., Norenzayan, A., Heine, S. J., Yamagishi, T., & Kameda, T. (2010). Evolution, culture, and the human mind. New York: Psychology Press.
- Schaller, M., Simpson, J. A., & Kenrick, D. T. (2006). Evolution and social psychology. New York: Psychology Press.
- Crandall, C. S., & Schaller, M. (2005). Social psychology of prejudice: Historical and contemporary issues. Lawrence KS: Lewinian Press.
- Schaller, M. & Crandall, C. S. (2004). The psychological foundations of culture. Mahwah NJ: Lawrence Erlbaum Associates.

== Selected articles ==
- Schaller, M., & Murray, D. R. (2008). Pathogens, personality and culture: Disease prevalence predicts worldwide variability in sociosexuality, extraversion, and openness to experience. Journal of Personality and Social Psychology, 95, 212–221.
- Park, J. H., Schaller, M., & Van Vugt, M. (2008). Psychology of human kin recognition: Heuristic cues, erroneous inferences, and their implications. Review of General Psychology, 12, 215–235.
- Maner, J. K., DeWall, C. N., Baumeister, R. F., & Schaller, M. (2007). Does social exclusion motivate interpersonal reconnection? Resolving the "porcupine problem." Journal of Personality and Social Psychology, 92, 42–55.
- Ackerman, J. M., Shapiro, J. R., Neuberg, S. L., Kenrick, D. T., Becker, D. V., Griskevicius, V., Maner, J., & Schaller, M. (2006). They all look the same to me (unless they're angry): From out-group homogeneity to out-group heterogeneity. Psychological Science, 17, 836–840.
- Maner, J. K., Kenrick, D. T., Becker, D. V., Robertson, T. E., Hofer, B., Neuberg, S. L., Delton, A. W., Butner, J., & Schaller, M. (2005). Functional projection: How fundamental social motives can bias interpersonal perception. Journal of Personality and Social Psychology, 88, 63–78.
- Schaller, M., Park, J. H., & Faulkner, J. (2003). Prehistoric dangers and contemporary prejudices. European Review of Social Psychology, 14, 105-137
- Conway, L. G., III, & Schaller, M. (2002). On the verifiability of evolutionary psychological theories: An analysis of the psychology of scientific persuasion. Personality and Social Psychology Review, 6, 152–166.
- Schaller, M., Conway, L. G., III, & Tanchuk, T. L. (2002). Selective pressures on the once and future contents of ethnic stereotypes: Effects of the communicability of traits. Journal of Personality and Social Psychology, 82, 861–877.
- Schaller, M. (1997). The psychological consequences of fame: Three tests of the self-consciousness hypothesis. Journal of Personality, 65, 291–309.
