= Cardon cactus =

Cardon cactus is a common name for several plants and may refer to:

- Echinopsis atacamensis, a species of cactus native to Chile, Argentina, and Bolivia
- Pachycereus pringlei, a species of cactus native to northwestern Mexico
