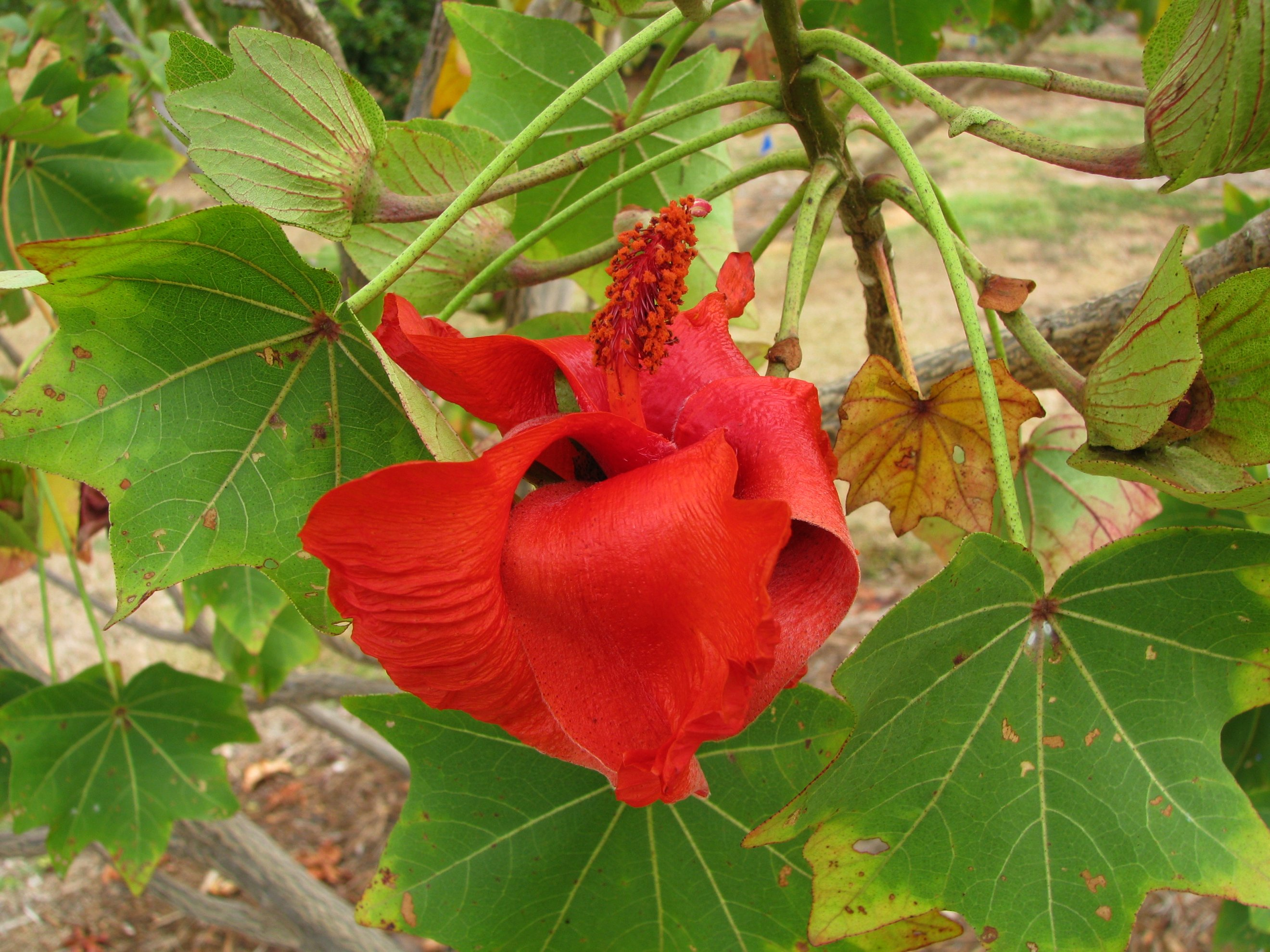

Conservation status
- Extinct in the Wild (IUCN 2.3)

Scientific classification
- Kingdom: Plantae
- Clade: Tracheophytes
- Clade: Angiosperms
- Clade: Eudicots
- Clade: Rosids
- Order: Malvales
- Family: Malvaceae
- Genus: Kokia
- Species: K. cookei

Binomial name
- Kokia cookei O.Deg.

= Kokia cookei =

Species of tree

Kokia cookei is a small, deciduous tree commonly known as the kokiʻo, Molokaʻi treecotton, Cooke's kokiʻo, or Molokaʻi kokiʻo. It is about 3 m (9.8 ft) in height, with simple leaves of 5 to 7 lobes, and large flowers. The fruit that the plant produces is composed of a five-lobed capsule that is dry and covered with short, dense hairs. The Kokia follows the typical flowering plant life cycle. It was distributed in the lowlands of the Hawaiian islands prior to going extinct in the wild in 1978. It survives only as grafted branches on other Kokia species trees. Conservation efforts, such as cultivation, are in place to attempt to nurse the species back to health. It is suspected that the species played a major role in the ecosystem through pollination but it is not confirmed.

== Distribution ==
This species is only known to have existed in the lowlands of the western Molokaʻi island in the Hawaiian Islands. Presumably, its native habitat was lowland dry forests on the leeward western end of the island. However, the complete natural range cannot be completely determined due to devastating and complete habitat loss of the dry forests on the Moloka'i island due to poor land practices. This landscape was destroyed by Polynesian settlers, around the year 1000 CE, to make room for agriculture. The species seems to have been noted by these settlers, as suggested by the native name hau heleʻula ("entirely red hau"). The three trees that were initially found grew near Mahana, northeast of Puu Nāna at approximately 200 metres (660 ft) elevation.

Although the original forest ecosystem was destroyed by settlers, and the original species were replaced by shrubland with plants, like native ʻilieʻe (Plumbago zeylanica) and introduced flora, Molokaʻi kokiʻo survived initially. The species seems to have had some tolerance to habitat change, enabling it to hang on until the 19th century, but it was ultimately unable to overcome the loss of habitat, leading to extinction in the wild.

=== Abundance ===
In the wild, Kokia cookei is extinct. The species is currently found exclusively on the islands of Maui, Moloka'i, Hawaiʻi, and O'ahu in five separate places as 23 grafted plants with the hopes of a reintroduction into the wild through breeding and cloning. Facilities on the islands of Maui and O'ahu are cultivating seven individuals. There is a single K. cookei at a private home on the island of Hawaiʻi. The remaining 15 individuals are located at Puu Nana, on Moloka'i Ranch properties, in little outplanting locations.

== Conservation ==
It is considered one of the rarest and most endangered plant species in the world. Even when first found in the 1860s, only three trees could be located. It was presumed extinct in the 1950s when the last surviving seedling perished. However, in 1970, a single plant was discovered on the same Kauluwai estate where the "last" individual grew, presumably a surviving relict of one of the plants previously cultivated there. Although this tree was destroyed in a fire in 1978, a branch that was removed earlier was grafted onto the related, and also endangered, Kokia kauaiensis. Currently there exist about 23 grafted plants. Research and conservation efforts regarding the K. cookei are extensive. Studies are being published looking into embryo cultures, biomimetic strategies, and other cultivation techniques. Most of these modern conservation efforts are still in their early stages, and recovery of the species has yet to be successful. There have been some scientifically promising results, and researchers are hopeful that the K. cookei will eventually exist in the wild again.

== Putative pollinators ==
It is hypothesized that the K. cookei was an essential pollinator in its native ecosystem. Its eventual extinction in wild state of the species seems for a large part due to coextinction with native nectarivorous birds. K. cookei seems to be adapted to bird pollination like most related Malvaceae. The birds, Drepanidinae, were extirpated from dryland forest by Polynesians, and most remaining species entirely succumbed to mosquito-borne diseases like avian malaria (Plasmodium relictum) and fowlpox in the 19th century.

The wide, large flowers of Molokaʻi kokiʻo would have admitted a wide range of potential pollinators (as opposed to e.g. Hibiscadelphus):

- Maui Nui ʻalauahio, Paroreomyza montana ssp? – extirpated from island (prehistorically?)
- Kākāwahie, Paroreomyza flammea – extirpated from lowlands by 1900, extinct (1963)
- Common ʻamakihi, Hemignathus virens – extirpated from lowlands by 1900
- ʻIʻiwi, Vestiaria coccinea – extirpated from lowlands by 1900
- Black mamo, Drepanis funerea – extinct (1907); not certain if it regularly occurred in habitat
- ʻApapane, Himatione sanguinea – extirpated from lowlands by 1900
- ʻAkohekohe, Palmeria dolei – extirpated from island (1907); not certain if it regularly occurred in habitat

Of these, the ʻIʻiwi was perhaps the most important, given that the other species were all either small and short-billed (K. cookei has quite large flowers), or did probably not occur in its habitat in significant numbers.

== See also ==
- Flora and fauna of Molokai
