= Hibiscadelphus crucibracteatus =

Conservation status
- Extinct (1982) (IUCN 2.3)

- Possibly Extinct (NatureServe)

Scientific classification
- Kingdom: Plantae
- Clade: Tracheophytes
- Clade: Angiosperms
- Clade: Eudicots
- Clade: Rosids
- Order: Malvales
- Family: Malvaceae
- Genus: Hibiscadelphus
- Species: †H. crucibracteatus

Binomial name
- †Hibiscadelphus crucibracteatus Hobdy

Extinct species of flowering plant

Hibiscadelphus crucibracteatus (lava hau kuahiwi) is an extinct species of flowering plant in the family Malvaceae that was endemic to Hawaii, on the island of Lānaʻi.

The single known specimen was discovered on the Puhielelu ridge in 1981 and has since died, with collected seeds failing to germinate.

== Taxonomy ==
It was described in 1984 by American botanist Robert W. Hobdy, based on a single specimen discovered by Peter Connally in 1981. It was most closely related to Hibiscadelphus wilderianus and Hibiscadelphus giffardianus, differing most notably in the shape and size of the bracts, capsules, and petals.

== Description ==
Hibiscadelphus crucibracteatus was a tree, reaching about 6 meters (19 feet) in height with a rounded crown. The bark was smooth and gray. The papery leaves grew 7 to 10 centimeters (2.7 to 3.9 inches) long and 7 to 8 centimeters (2.7 to 3.1 inches) wide, and were heart-shaped, with five to seven prominent veins. Flowers were borne singly on 2 to 3.5 centimeter (.78 to 1.1 inch) long peduncles.

== Distribution and habitat ==
The single known specimen was discovered growing in a remnant pocket of moist native forest on an eroded, sparsely vegetated ridge on Lānaʻi's windward slopes. It was growing alongside kauila (Alphitonia ponderosa), hame (Antidesma platyphyllum), Diospyros ferrea, ʻālaʻa (Planchonella sandwichensis), ʻopiko (Pscyhotria mauiensis), lanai hala pepe (Pleomele fernaldii), ʻōhiʻa ha (Syzygium sandwicense), and āulu (Rockia sandwicensis).

== Conservation ==
Hibiscadelphus crucibracteatus is classified as Extinct by the IUCN and possibly extinct by NatureServe. This species has only been discovered once in the wild, with the single known tree dying within a few years of its discovery due to depredation damage inflicted by the introduced chital (Axis axis) despite it having been fenced to protect from deer damage. Although seed was collected on multiple occasions, all attempts at cultivation or propagation failed. As there are still pockets of suitable habitat, there is a possibility that other individuals may still exist.
