= Hawaiian hibiscus =

Species of plant

Hawaiian hibiscus are seven species of hibiscus native to Hawaii. The yellow hibiscus is Hawaii's state flower. Most commonly grown as ornamental plants in the Hawaiian Islands are the non-native Chinese hibiscus (Hibiscus rosa-sinensis) and its numerous hybrids, though the native Hibiscus arnottianus is occasionally planted.

The native plants in the genus Hibiscus in Hawaii are thought to have derived from four independent colonization events for the five endemic species (four closely related species plus the yellow-flowered species) and one each for the two indigenous species.

== Native species ==
The native hibiscus found in Hawaii are:

- Hibiscus arnottianus A.Gray – kokiʻo keʻokeʻo ("kokiʻo that is white like the shine of silver") is an endemic species of hibiscus with white flowers. Three subspecies are recognized: H. arnottianus ssp. arnottianus found in the Waianae Range of western Oahu; H. a. ssp. immaculatus which is very rare (listed as endangered) on Molokai; and H. a. ssp. punaluuensis from the Koʻolau Range on Oahu. Perhaps only a dozen plants of H. a. ssp. immaculatus exist in nature in mesic and wet forests. This species is closely related to H. waimeae, and the two are among the very few members of the genus with fragrant flowers. It is sometimes planted as an ornamental or crossed with H. rosa-sinensis. In the Hawaiian language, the white hibiscus is known as the pua aloalo.
- Hibiscus brackenridgei A.Gray – maʻo hau hele ("hau most similar to maʻo") is a tall shrub (up to 10 m or 33 ft) with bright yellow flowers, closely related to the widespread H. divaricatus. Two subspecies are recognized: H. b. ssp. brackenridgei, a sprawling shrub to an erect tree found in dry forests and low shrublands at elevations of 400–2,600 ft (120–790 m) above sea level on Molokai, Lanai, Maui, and the island of Hawaii; and H. b. ssp. mokuleianus, a tree from dry habitats on Kauai and the Waianae Range on Oahu. This species is listed as an endangered species by the USFWS. The yellow flower of this species was made the official state flower of Hawaii on 6 June 1988, and although endangered in its natural habitats, has become a moderately popular ornamental in Hawaiian yards.
- Hibiscus clayi O.Deg. & I.Deg. is an endemic shrub or small tree with bright red flowers, generally similar to H. kokio, and found in nature on Kauai in dry forests. It is listed as endangered by USFWS.
- Hibiscus furcellatus Desr. is a pink-flowered hibiscus considered an indigenous species, typically found in low and marshy areas of the Caribbean, Florida, Central and South America, and Hawaii, where it is known as ʻakiohala, ʻakiahala, hau hele, and hau hele wai ("entirely puce hau").
- Hibiscus kokio Hillebr., kokiʻo or kokiʻo ʻula ("red kokiʻo") is a shrub or small tree (3–7 m or 9.8–23.0 ft) with red to orangish (or rarely yellow) flowers. This endemic species is not officially listed, but considered rare in nature. Two subspecies are recognized: H. kokio ssp. kokio found in dry to wet forests on Kauai, Oahu, Maui, and possibly Hawaii at elevations of 70–800 m (230–2,620 ft); and H. k. ssp. saintjohnianus from northwestern Kauai at elevations of 150–890 m (490–2,920 ft).
- Hibiscus tiliaceus L., hau, is a spreading shrub or tree common to the tropics and subtropics, especially in coastal areas. This species is possibly indigenous to Hawaii, but may have been introduced by the early Polynesians.
- Hibiscus waimeae A.Heller, kokiʻo keʻokeʻo or kokiʻo kea ("kokiʻo that is white as snow"), is a Hawaiian endemic, gray-barked tree, 6–10 m (20–33 ft) tall, with white flowers that fade to pink in the afternoon. Two subspecies are recognized: H. waimeae ssp. hannerae (rare and listed as endangered) found in northwestern valleys of Kauai, and H. w. ssp. waimeae occurring in the Waimea Canyon and some western to southern valleys on Kauai. This species closely resembles H. arnottianus in a number of characteristics.
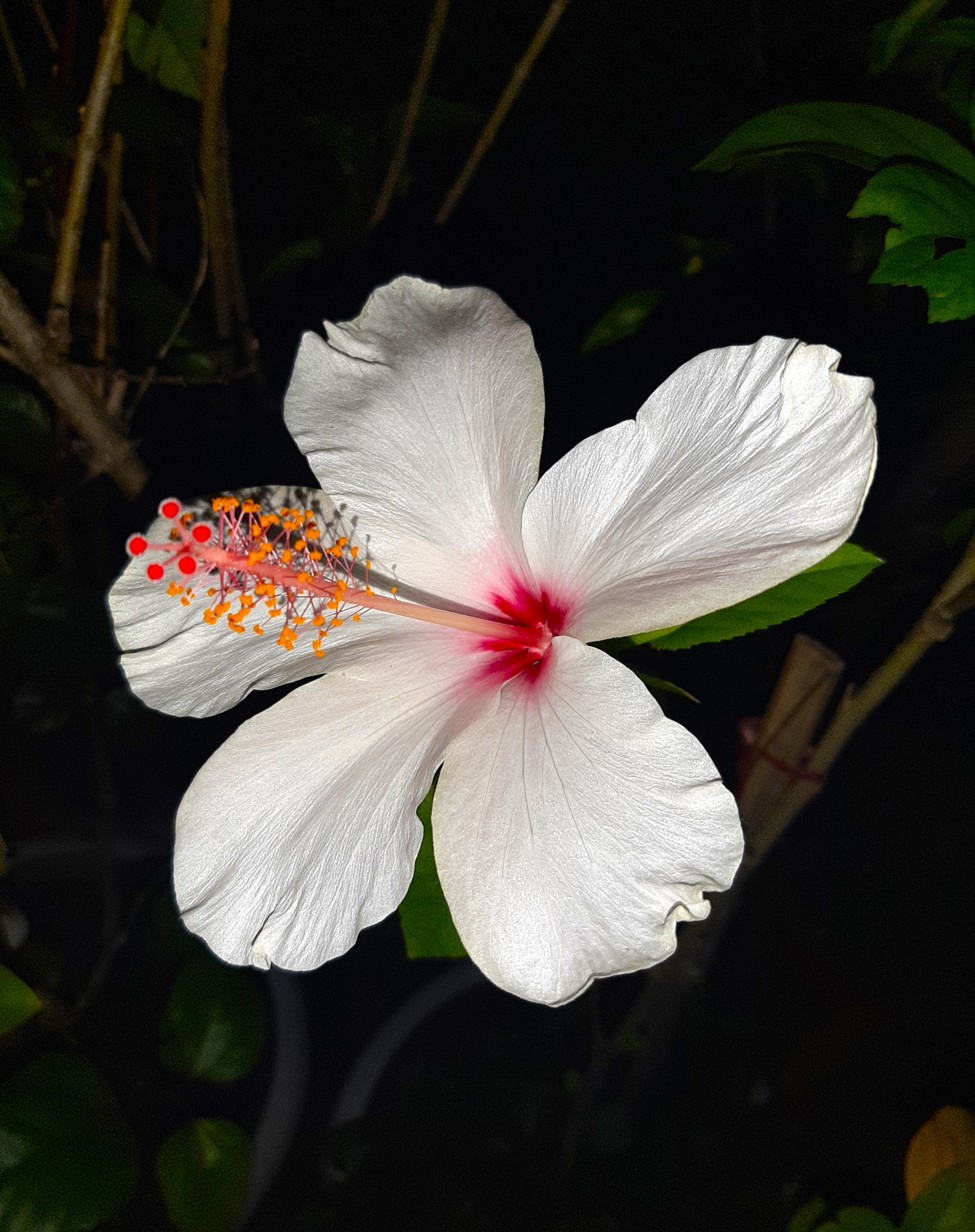
Hibiscus arnottianus

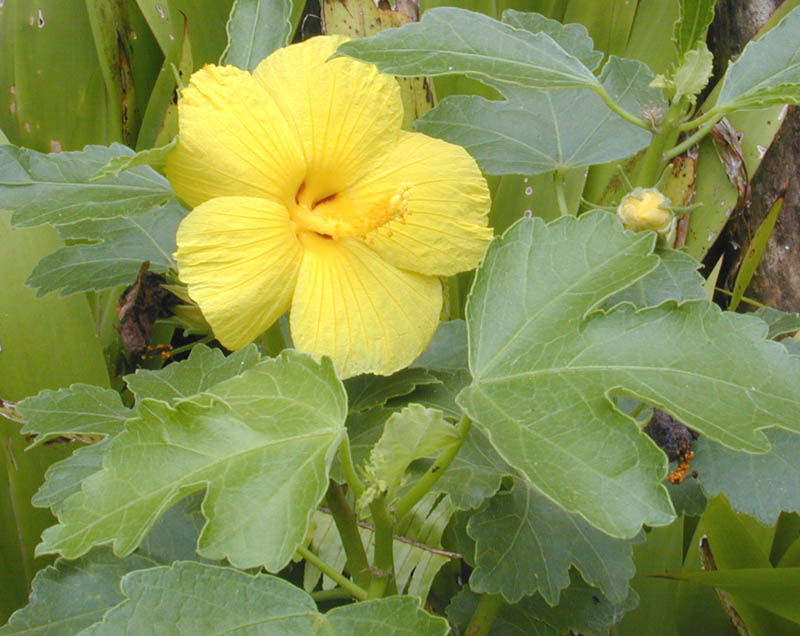
Hibiscus brackenridgei

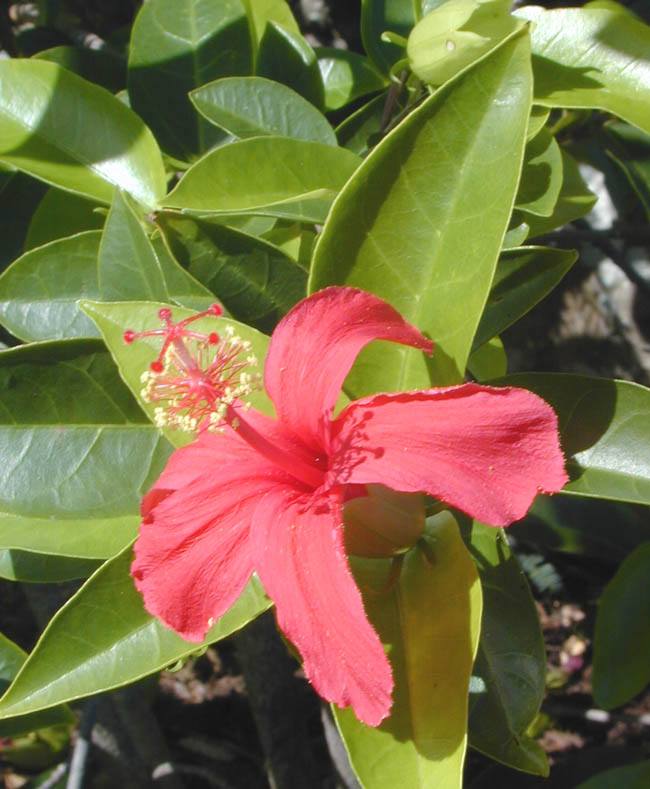
Hibiscus clayi

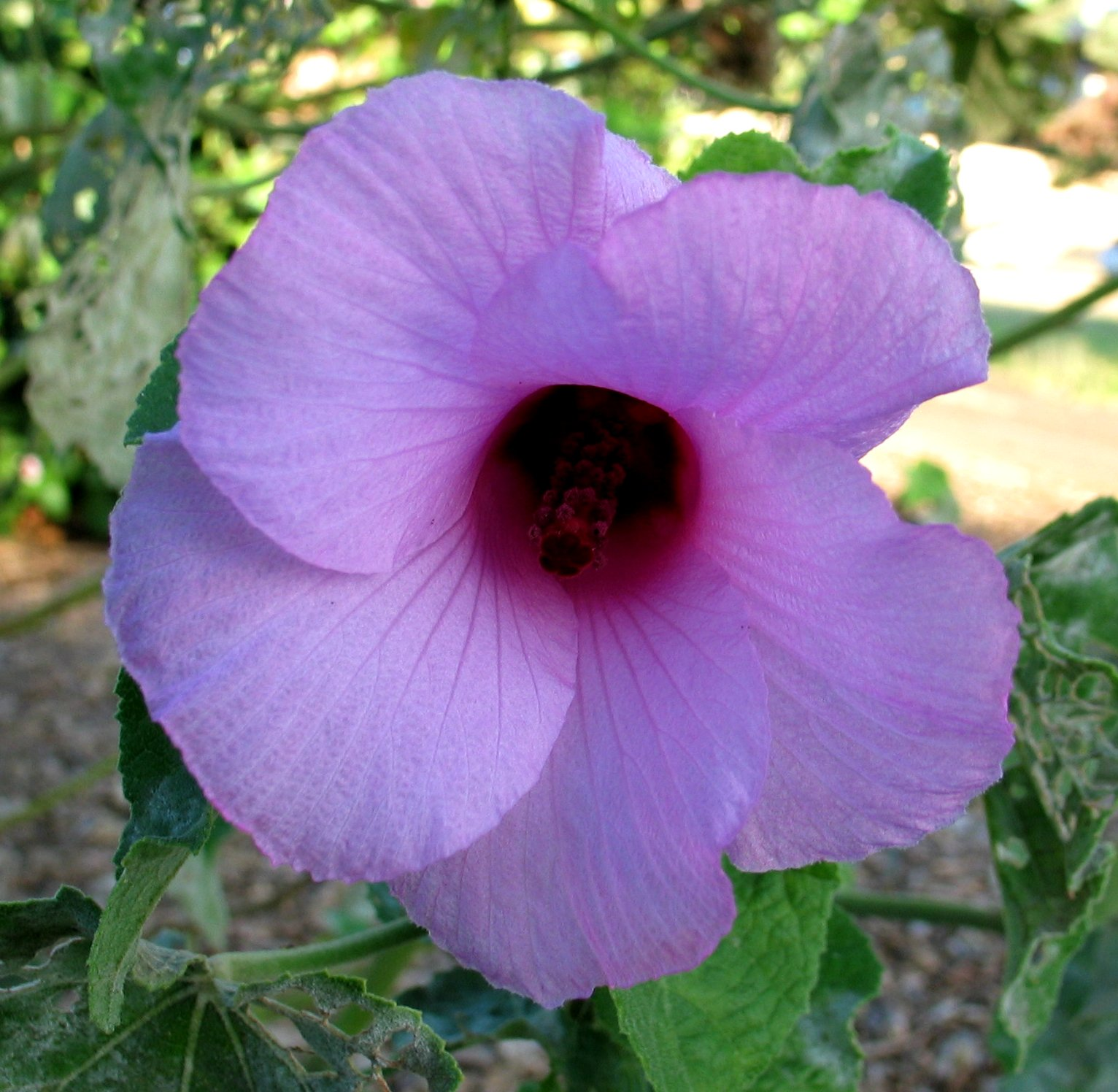
Hibiscus furcellatus

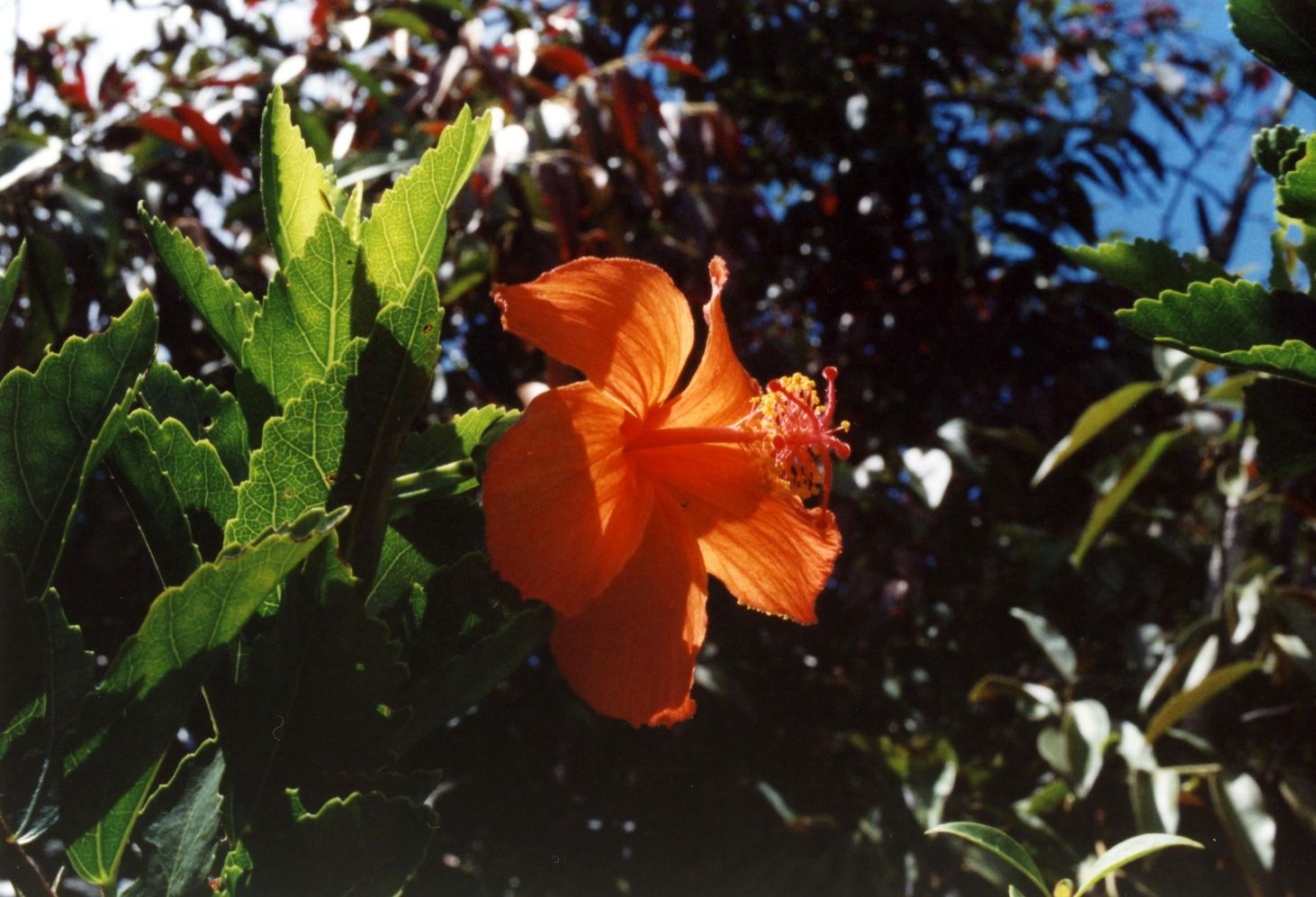
Hibiscus kokio

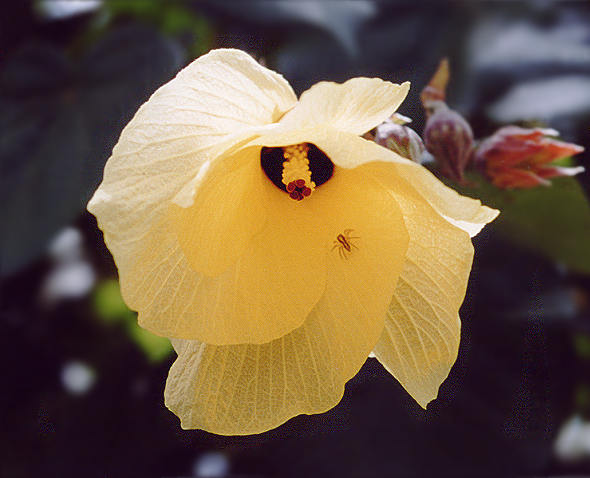
Hibiscus tiliaceus

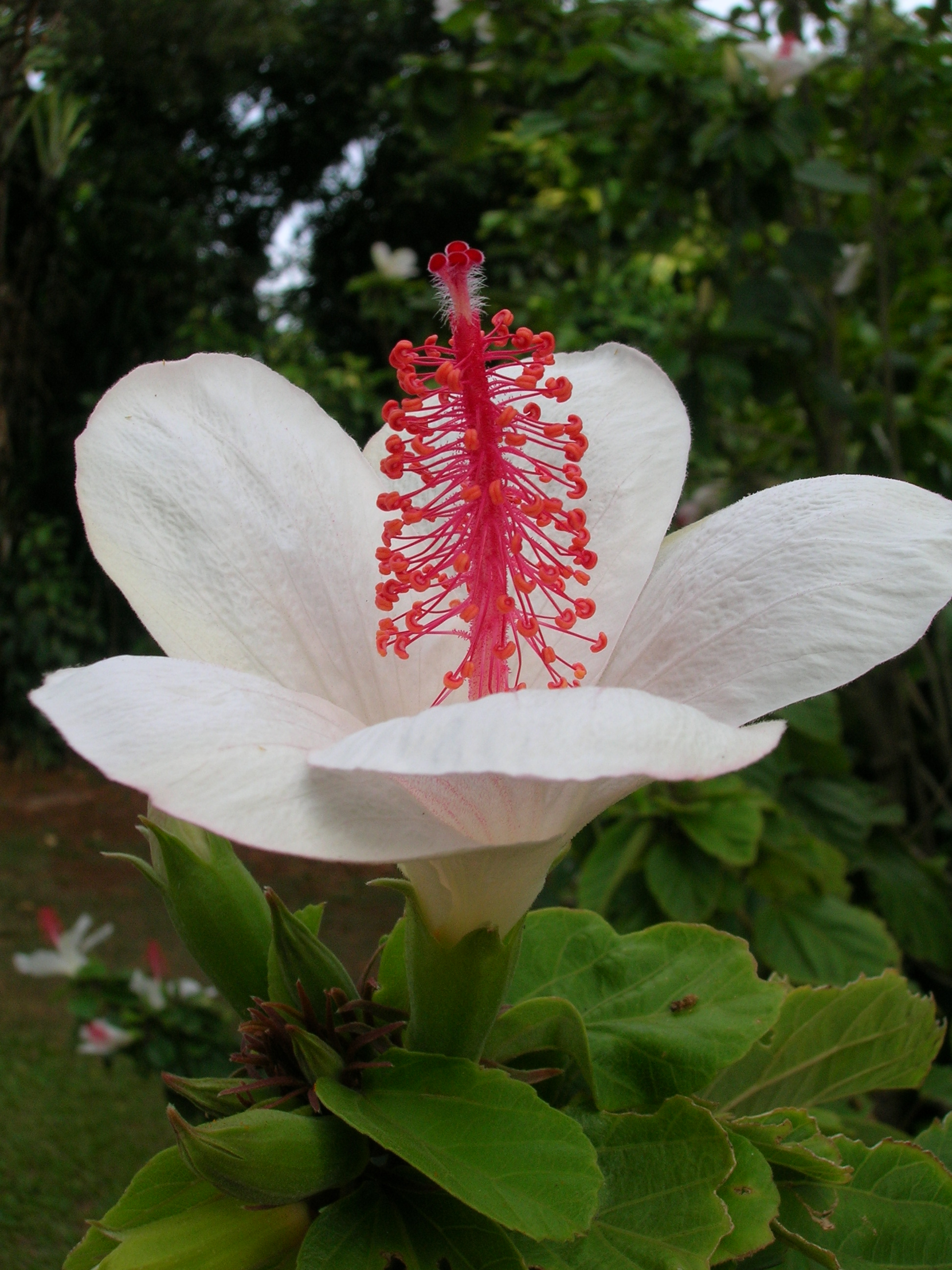
Hibiscus waimeae

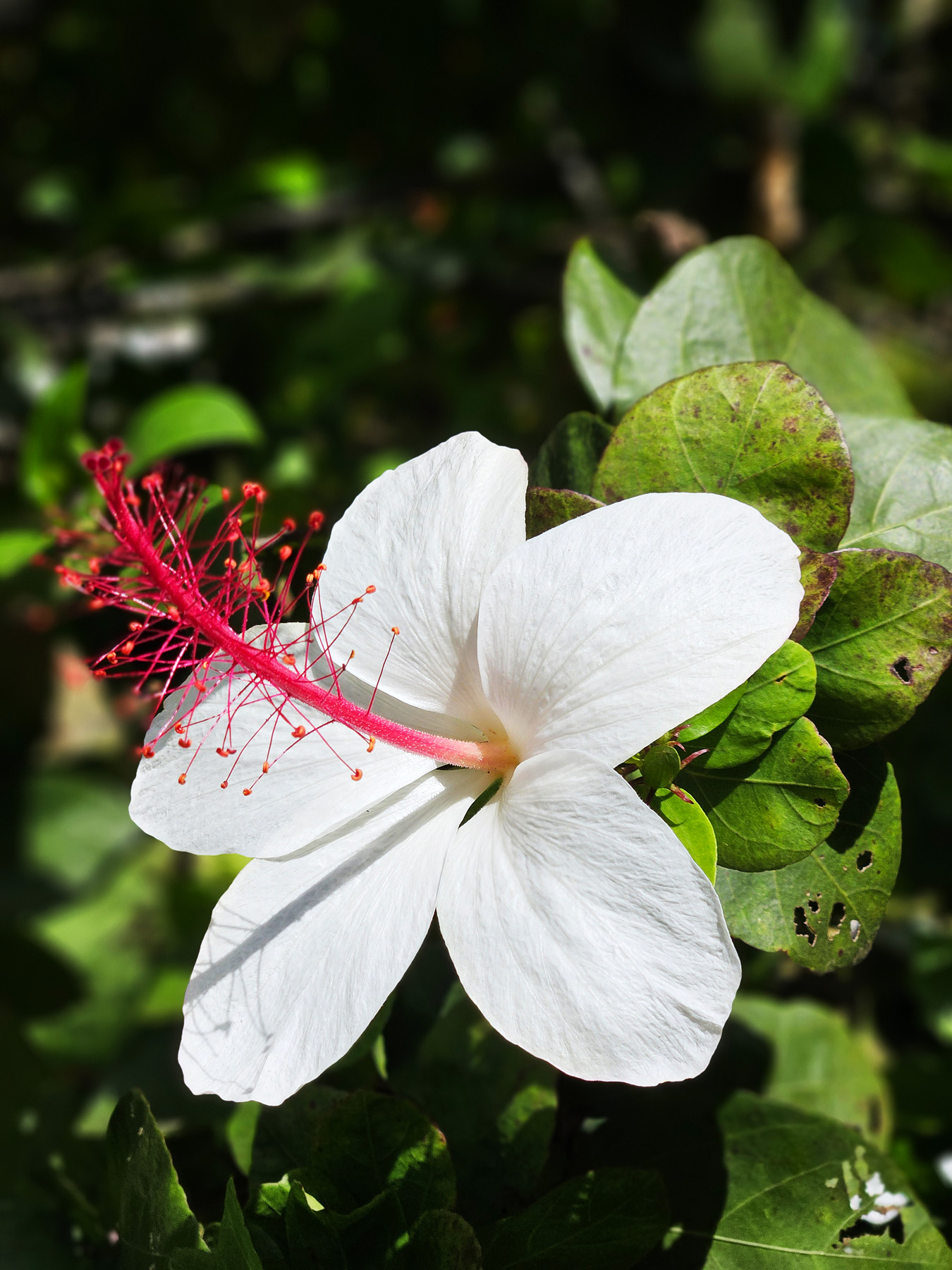
Hibiscus arnottianus A.Gray

== Other Malvaceae ==
In addition to the species of Hibiscus listed above, flowers of several other related Hawaiian plants of the family Malvaceae resemble Hibiscus flowers, although are generally smaller. The endemic genus, Hibiscadelphus, comprises seven species described from Hawaii. Three of these are now thought to be extinct and the remaining four are listed as critically endangered or extinct in the wild. Another endemic genus, Kokia, comprises four species of trees. All but one (K. kauaiensis) are listed as either extinct or nearly extinct in the wild.

Three endemic species of the pantropical genus, Abutilon occur in Hawaii: A. eremitopetalum, A. menziesii, and A. sandwicense; all are listed as endangered. Cotton plants (Gossypium spp.), whose bright yellow flowers are certainly hibiscus-like, include one endemic: G. tomentosum, uncommon but found in dry places on all the main islands except Hawaii. The widespread milo (Thespesia populnea) is an indigenous tree with yellow and maroon flowers.

South Korea's national flower is the Hibiscus syriacus which is widely found in Hawaii, too.
