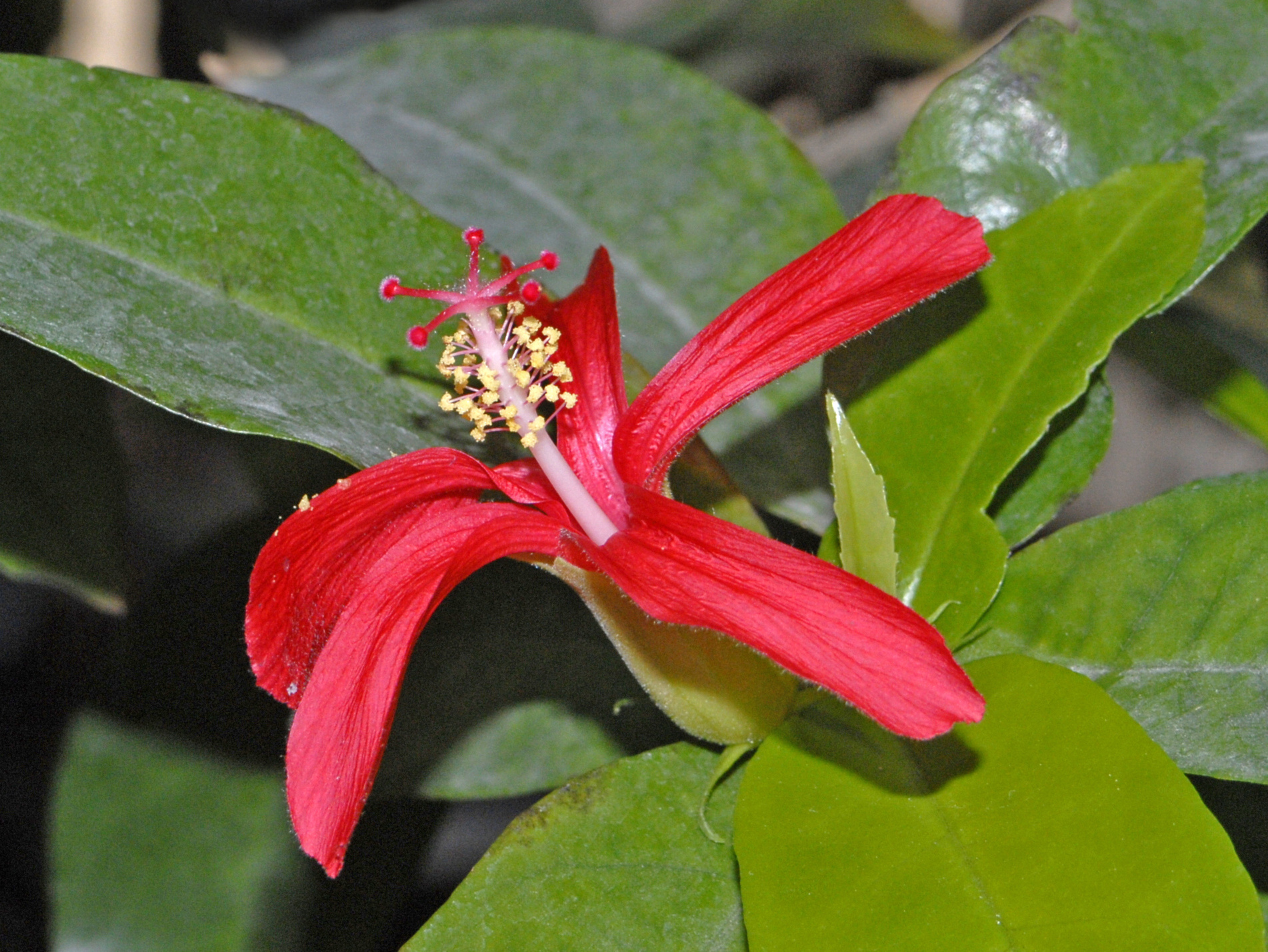
- At the Jardin des Plantes, Paris

Conservation status
- Critically Endangered (IUCN 3.1)

- Critically Imperiled (NatureServe)

Scientific classification
- Kingdom: Plantae
- Clade: Tracheophytes
- Clade: Angiosperms
- Clade: Eudicots
- Clade: Rosids
- Order: Malvales
- Family: Malvaceae
- Genus: Hibiscus
- Species: H. clayi

Binomial name
- Hibiscus clayi O.Deg. & I.Deg.

Synonyms
- Hibiscus newhousei M.J.Roe

= Hibiscus clayi =

Species of flowering plant

Hibiscus clayi, common names red Kauai rosemallow, Clay's hibiscus or Kokiʻo ʻula (Hawaiian name), is a perennial angiosperm of the mallow family Malvaceae. This species has unique leaves that are round and toothed and grow in a decussate pattern.

== Etymology ==
The generic name is derived from the Greek word ἱβίσκος (hibískos), which was the name Pedanius Dioscorides (ca. 40–90) gave to Althaea officinalis. The species name clayi honors Horace F. Clay, a horticulturalist of Hawaii.

== Description ==
Hibiscus clayi is a shrub of 40–90 centimetres (16–35 in) or a tree reaching a height of 4–8 metres (13–26 ft). Leaves are medium green, shiny, smooth-edged or slightly toothed on the tip. Single flowers are borne at the ends of the branches. They are showy, bright or dark red and they bloom all year around. Their flowers can be big with thin petals or they can also be compact with tiny, circular petals. They are generally similar to Hibiscus kokio. This plant is listed as endangered by USFWS.

== Distribution and habitat ==
This plant is endemic to Hawaii. It can be found in nature only in the dry forest of Nounou Mountains in the eastern Kauaʻi, at an elevation of 50–600 metres (160–1,970 ft) above sea level. The conservation status of H. clayi is listed as Critically Endangered on the IUCN Red List.

== Threats ==
The Nounou Mountains of Kaua'i hold all four of the trees known to still exist. The threats that endanger the H. clayi species are competition with alien plants, close proximity to hiking trails, making them prone to disturbance, pigs, and limited reproduction due to the low population in the wild. Cattle and pigs have grazed on the H. clayi, causing a significant amount of damage to the H. clayi population, which has ultimately led to its decline.

== Conservation efforts ==
In order to conserve these plants, suitable habitats should be identified for relocation. Protection of the remaining H. clayi should be looked into like a plant sanctuary. In the near future, the remaining H. clayi should be protected and establish new populations of it to reduce the risk of extinction. Augmentation of the wild populations and growing new populations in a safe area is another conservation effort that can be made. The University of Hawaii at Leeward Community College has a native garden that grows endangered species of plants, with H. clayi included.

== See also ==
- Hawaiian hibiscus
