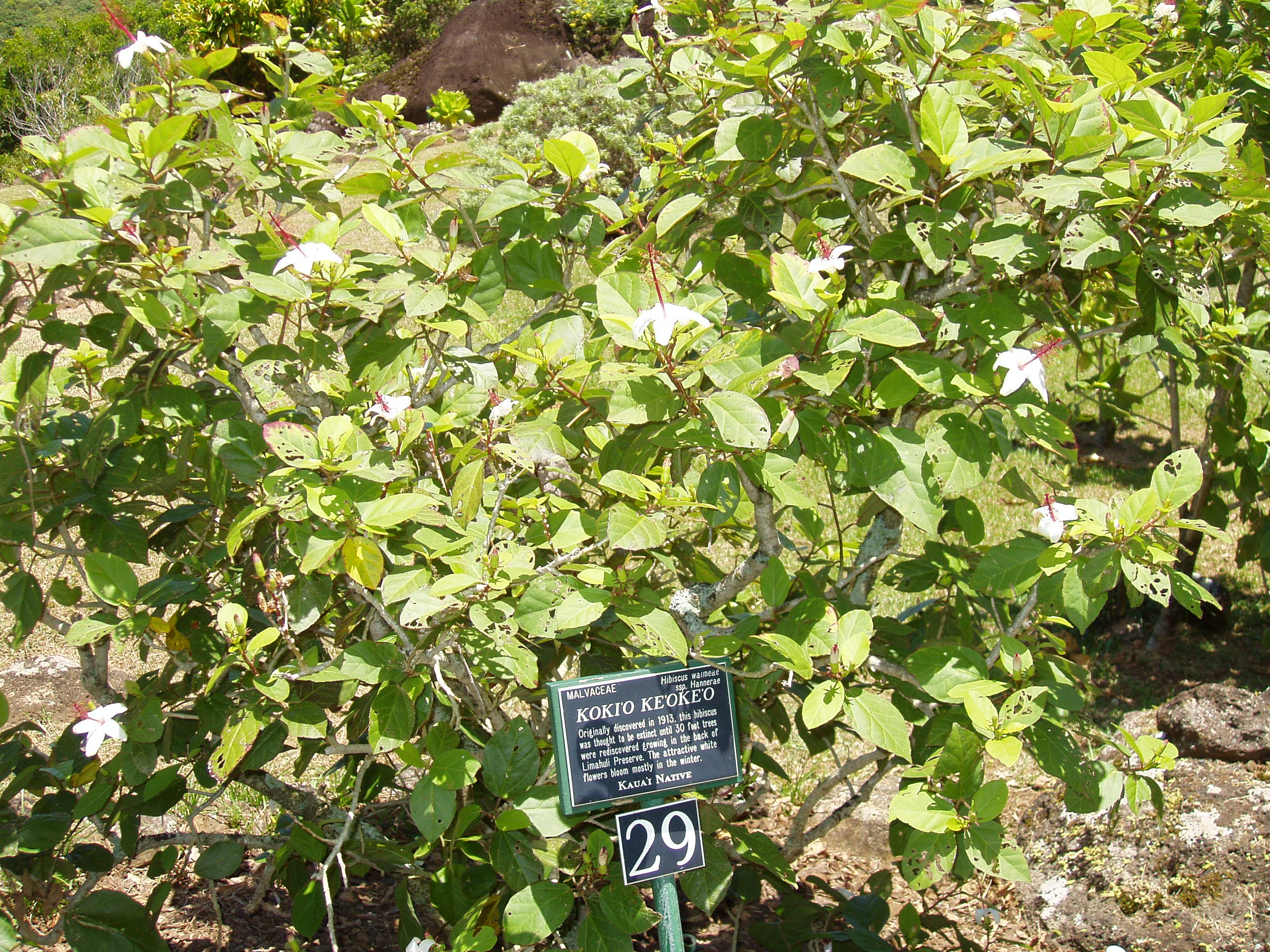
- Hibiscus waimeae subsp. hannerae

Conservation status
- Imperiled (NatureServe)

Scientific classification
- Kingdom: Plantae
- Clade: Tracheophytes
- Clade: Angiosperms
- Clade: Eudicots
- Clade: Rosids
- Order: Malvales
- Family: Malvaceae
- Genus: Hibiscus
- Species: H. waimeae

Binomial name
- Hibiscus waimeae A.Heller

Subspecies
- H. w. hannerae (O.Deg & I.Deg.) D.Bates; H. w. waimeae

= Hibiscus waimeae =

Species of tree

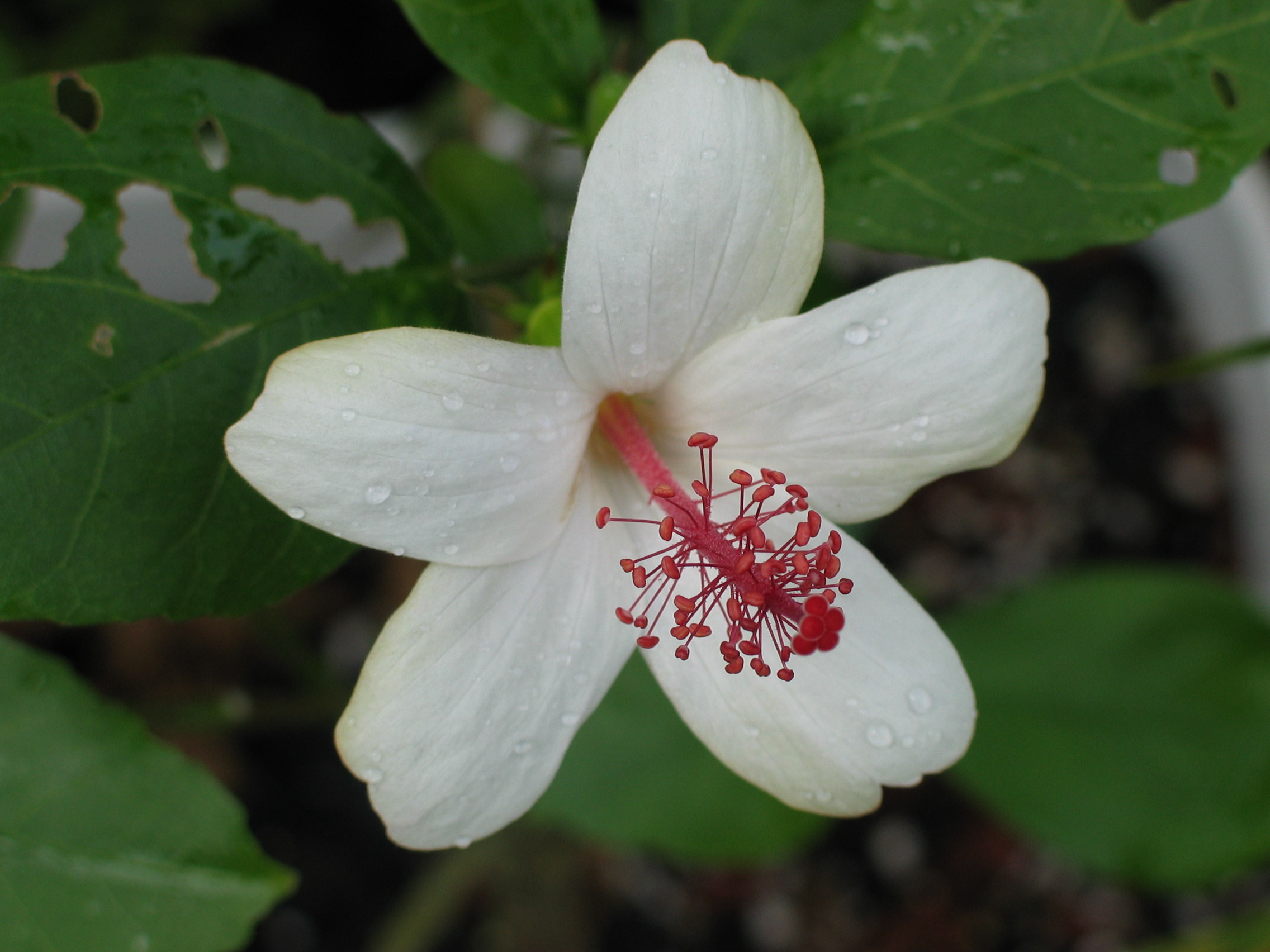
H. waimeae subsp. hannerae flower

Hibiscus waimeae (white Kauai rosemallow, Hawaiian: kokiʻo keʻokeʻo, or kokiʻo kea) is a species of flowering plant within the okra family, Malvaceae, that is endemic to the island of Kauaʻi in Hawaii.

== Etymology ==
Hibiscus refers to the Greek word ibiscos meaning mallow, and waimeae is derived from Waimea Canyon, where the hibiscus waimeae is found. The hibiscus waimeae is also known in Hawaiian as kokiʻo kea. Kokiʻo is the Hawaiian language word for hibiscus and kea is the Hawaiian word for white.

== Description ==
It is a small gray-barked tree, reaching on average a height of 6–10 metres (20–33 ft) and an average trunk diameter of 0.3 m (0.98 ft). Around 1/8 inches long, the fuzzy brown seeds of the hibiscus waimeae plant are enclosed in protective oblong pods.

Hibiscus waimeae blooms year-round, though it may experience brief periods without bloom, particularly in the cooler seasons. The flowers last for a single day, starting out white and fading to pink in the afternoon. Though flowers bloom and close over the course of one day, the plant itself can live longer than 5 years.

H. arnottianus of Oʻahu and Molokaʻi and H. waimeae are the only Hawaiian hibiscuses that have white flowers. Producing a sweet-smelling flower, the hibiscus waimeae plant is also one of only two hibiscus species to have a fragrance.

== Distribution and habitat ==
H. waimeae inhabits coastal mesic, mixed mesic, and wet forests at elevations of 250–1,200 m (820–3,940 ft).

H. waimeae subsp. waimeae can be found in the western and southwestern parts of the island, where it grows in the Waimea Canyon area and valleys that face the ocean. H. waimeae subsp. hannerae is rarer (listed as endangered by the USFWS) and can often be found in the northwestern part of the island where it grows in the Hanakapiʻai, Limahuli, and Kalihi Wai valleys.

== Uses ==
Hibiscus waimeae, like many hibiscus species, are popularly placed in the hair or tucked behind the ear. It is also commonly used to make leis, which are garlands typically made of strung together flowers and used in many different types of celebrations.

The plant was primarily grown around homes and used as decoration by Native Hawaiians, though it is said that H. waimeae flowers were also eaten by men and boys as a laxative.

== Cultivation ==
Due to the easily hybridized nature of Hibiscus plants, it is recommended that seeds are hand pollinated after removal from their pods. H. waimeae can be propagated via seeds, cutting, air layering, and grafting.
