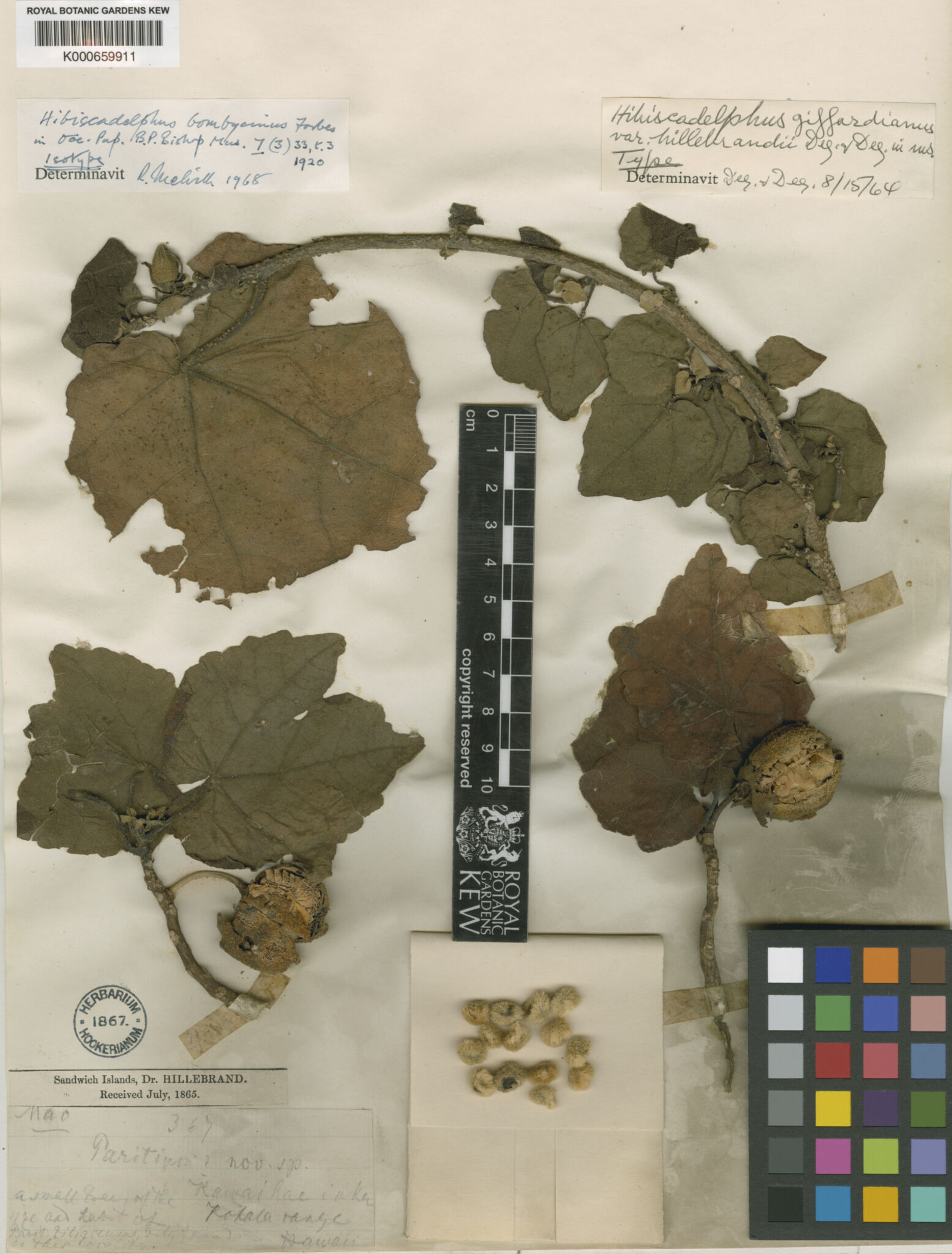
- Hibiscadelphus bombycinus type specimen

Conservation status
- Extinct (1868) (IUCN 2.3)

- Possibly Extinct (NatureServe)

Scientific classification
- Kingdom: Plantae
- Clade: Tracheophytes
- Clade: Angiosperms
- Clade: Eudicots
- Clade: Rosids
- Order: Malvales
- Family: Malvaceae
- Genus: Hibiscadelphus
- Species: †H. bombycinus

Binomial name
- †Hibiscadelphus bombycinus C.N.Forbes

= Hibiscadelphus bombycinus =

Extinct species of flowering plant

Hibiscadelphus bombycinus, the Kawaihae hibiscadelphus, is an extinct species of flowering plant in the mallow family, Malvaceae. It was endemic to the Kohala mountain on the island of Hawaiʻi, in the U.S. state of Hawaii. It has not been collected since 1865. It is presumed to have been extinct since 1920.

== Taxonomy ==
It was described in 1920 by American botanist Charles Noyes Forbes based on a specimen in the Bernice P. Bishop Museum's herbarium collected by William Hillebrand in the Kawaihae area around 1865. It was closely related to Hibiscadelphus hualalaiensis, but had smaller leaves and differently shaped bracts. The seed capsules resembled those of H. hualalaiensis and Hibiscadelphus giffardianus. At the time of collection, it was referred by Hillebrand to "Hibiscus section Bombycina" although, according to Forbes, "Hillebrand described no Hibiscus with the characters of Hibiscadelphus".

== Description ==
Hibiscadelphus bombycinus was a tree or shrub, growing up to about 4.5 meters (15 feet) tall. The leaves were kidney-shaped or circular, stellate pubsecent (having star-shaped hairs) on both sides but especially below. Leaves had five poorly defined lobes with slightly wavy margins and rounded tips which overlapped at the base of the leaf. Petioles were hairy and 4.2 to 5.2 centimeters long. Pedicels of 2.1 to 3 centimeters in length bore single flowers with 9 millimeter long strap-shaped involucral bracts. The flower's calyx was six-lobed, cup-shaped, and stellate pubescent. The petals were 3.4 centimeters long, covered in dense stellate hairs, slightly curved, and barely opened at all, as is the case with other Hibiscadelphus species. Capsules were woody, with dense yellowish stellate hairs covering the exterior surface, and were either circular and 2.9 centimeters tall or egg-shaped and 3.2 centimeters tall.

== Distribution and habitat ==
Nothing is known about Hibiscadelphus bombycinus's habitat and ecology. The holotype was collected on the leeward slopes of Kohala, and it likely occurred in moist to mesic forests.

== Status ==
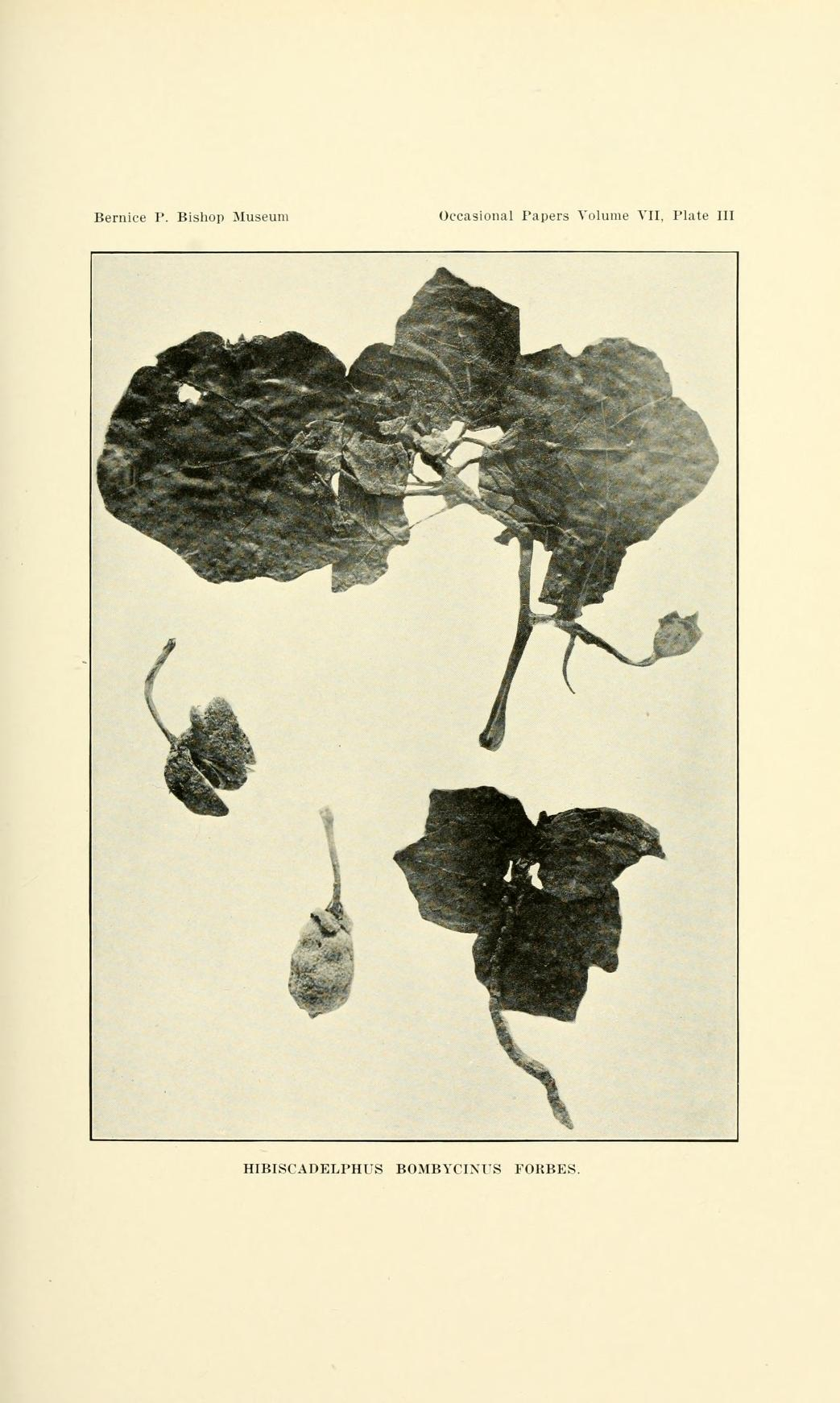
Plate of Hibiscadelphus bombycinus, published along with original description in 1920.

Hibiscadelphus bombycinus is classified by the IUCN as extinct, and by NatureServe as possibly extinct. Forbes suggested that, due to extensive habitat destruction in the Kawaihae area, it was likely extinct at the time of description. The type locality, the northwestern slopes of Kohala, has been mostly converted to pastureland. However, some remnant native plant communities do still exist in deep gulches in the Kawaihae area, and there is a slim chance Hibiscadelphus bombycinus may persist there or somewhere else on Hawaiʻi.
