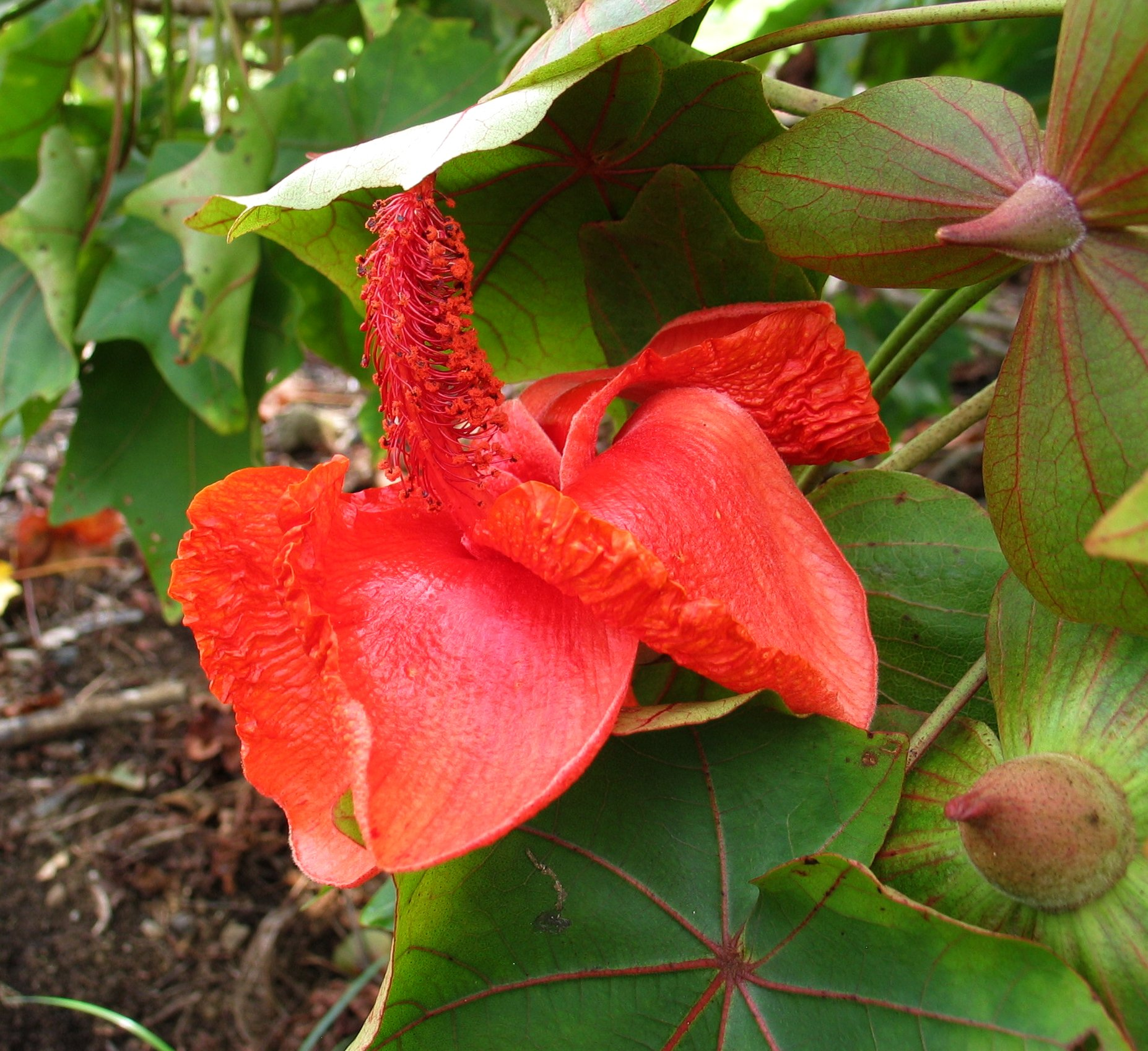

Conservation status
- Critically Endangered (IUCN 2.3)

Scientific classification
- Kingdom: Plantae
- Clade: Tracheophytes
- Clade: Angiosperms
- Clade: Eudicots
- Clade: Rosids
- Order: Malvales
- Family: Malvaceae
- Genus: Kokia
- Species: K. drynarioides

Binomial name
- Kokia drynarioides (Seem.) Lewton

Synonyms
- Gossypium drynarioides Seem.; Kokia rockii Lewton

= Kokia drynarioides =

Species of flowering plant in the mallow family Malvaceae

Kokia drynarioides, commonly known as Hawaiian tree cotton, is a species of flowering plant in the mallow family, Malvaceae, that is endemic to the Big Island of Hawaii. It inhabits dry forests at elevations of 455–1,915 m (1,493–6,283 ft). Associated plants include ʻāheahea (Chenopodium oahuense), ʻaʻaliʻi (Dodonaea viscosa), hala pepe (Pleomele hawaiiensis), wiliwili (Erythrina sandwicensis), uhiuhi (Caesalpinia kavaiensis), kōlea (Myrsine lanaiensis), ʻaiea (Nothocestrum latifolium), kuluʻī (Nototrichium sandwicense), ʻālaʻa (Planchonella sandwicensis), ʻohe kukuluāeʻo (Reynoldsia sandwicensis), māmane (Sophora chrysophylla), and maua (Xylosma hawaiensis var. hillebrandii). It is threatened by habitat loss and competition with invasive species, such as fountain grass (Pennisetum setaceum).
