= Kokia kauaiensis =

Kauaʻi kokiʻo

Conservation status
- Critically Endangered (IUCN 3.1)

Scientific classification
- Kingdom: Plantae
- Clade: Tracheophytes
- Clade: Angiosperms
- Clade: Eudicots
- Clade: Rosids
- Order: Malvales
- Family: Malvaceae
- Genus: Kokia
- Species: K. kauaiensis

Binomial name
- Kokia kauaiensis (Rock) O.Deg. & Duvel

Species of tree

Kokia kauaiensis, the Kauaʻi treecotton or Kauaʻi kokiʻo, is a species of flowering plant in the mallow family, Malvaceae, that is endemic to Kauaʻi, Hawaii.

It inhabits coastal mesic and mixed mesic forests at elevations of 350–660 m (1,150–2,170 ft). Associated plants include ʻahakea (Bobea spp.), koa (Acacia koa), lama (Diospyros sandwicensis), manono (Hedyotis spp.), hala pepe (Pleomele aurea), aupaka (Isodendrion spp.), papala kepau (Pisonia spp.), olopua (Nestegis sandwicensis), ʻōhiʻa hā (Syzygium sandwicensis), hame (Antidesma spp.), maile (Alyxia oliviformis), ʻālaʻa (Pouteria sandwicensis), aʻiaʻi (Streblus pendulinus), alaheʻe (Psydrax odorata), uluhe (Dicranopteris linearis), aloalo (Hibiscus spp.), mēhamehame (Flueggea neowawraea), alani (Melicope spp.), palapalai lau liʻi (Asplenium laciniatum), ʻoheʻohe (Tetraplasandra spp.), ʻakoko (Euphorbia celastroides), nehe (Lipochaeta spp), ʻaʻaliʻi (Dodonaea viscosa), ʻiliahi (Santalum spp.), poʻolā (Claoxylon sandwicense), and ʻōhiʻa lehua (Metrosideros polymorpha).

Kauaʻi Kokiʻo is a small tree, reaching a height of 5–10 m (16–33 ft). It is threatened by habitat loss.

Today there are about 45 or 50 individuals remaining. At one point there was only a single tree remaining.
