= Kokia =

Kokia may refer to:

- Kokia (plant), genus of flowering plants in the family Malvaceae
- Kokia (singer), Japanese singer-songwriter
- Uri Kokia (born 1981), basketball player and coach
