= Kokia lanceolata =

Conservation status
- Extinct (IUCN 2.3)

Scientific classification
- Kingdom: Plantae
- Clade: Tracheophytes
- Clade: Angiosperms
- Clade: Eudicots
- Clade: Rosids
- Order: Malvales
- Family: Malvaceae
- Genus: Kokia
- Species: †K. lanceolata

Binomial name
- †Kokia lanceolata Lewton

Extinct species of flowering plant

Kokia lanceolata, the Wailupe Valley treecotton, was a species of flowering plant in the family Malvaceae. It was the only species of Kokia to occur on the island of Oahu and originally known from the hills of Makapu'u, Koko Head and Wailupe Valley. It became extinct not long after its discovery in the 1880s, most likely due to grazing pressure from cattle and goat ranching.
