= Hibiscadelphus stellatus =

Scientific classification
- Kingdom: Plantae
- Clade: Tracheophytes
- Clade: Angiosperms
- Clade: Eudicots
- Clade: Rosids
- Order: Malvales
- Family: Malvaceae
- Genus: Hibiscadelphus
- Species: H. stellatus

Binomial name
- Hibiscadelphus stellatus H.Oppenh., Bustamente, & Perlman

Species of flowering plant

Hibiscadelphus stellatus is a species of flowering plant in the mallow family, Malvaceae. It is called stellar hau kuahiwi in the United States Department of Agriculture PLANTS database. It is endemic to West Maui, Hawaii. It was first formally described in 2014. The specific epithet stellatus comes from the Latin for "star-shaped", referring to its stellate pubescence and the five, star-shaped involucral bracts, as well as its "beautiful and stellar (outstanding) flowers".

It is only known from three populations and fewer than one hundred plants in a valley on the western side of the island. It is closely related to Hibiscadelphus wilderianus, differing in part in its denser hairiness and larger flowers.
