= Hibiscadelphus woodii =

Conservation status
- Critically Endangered (IUCN 3.1)

- Critically Imperiled (NatureServe)

Scientific classification
- Kingdom: Plantae
- Clade: Tracheophytes
- Clade: Angiosperms
- Clade: Eudicots
- Clade: Rosids
- Order: Malvales
- Family: Malvaceae
- Genus: Hibiscadelphus
- Species: H. woodii

Binomial name
- Hibiscadelphus woodii Lorence & W.L.Wagner

Species of tree

Hibiscadelphus woodii, or Wood's hau kuahiwi, is a species of flowering plant in the family Malvaceae endemic to Kauai, Hawaii.

== Description ==
It is a small tree, reaching a height of 2.5–5 m (8.2–16.4 ft).

== Distribution and habitat ==
Hibiscadelphus woodii inhabits basalt scree and cliff walls in ʻōhiʻa lehua (Metrosideros polymorpha) dominated mixed mesic forests at an elevation of 915 m (3,002 ft) in the Kalalau Valley. Associated plants include koʻokoʻolau (Bidens sandvicensis), ʻāhinahina (Artemisia australis), alani (Melicope pallida), naʻenaʻe (Dubautia spp.), ʻānaunau (Lepidium serra), nehe (Lipochaeta spp.), kolokolo kuahiwi (Lysimachia glutinosa), Carex meyenii, ʻakoko (Euphorbia spp.), manono (Hedyotis spp.), kuluʻī (Nototrichium spp.), Panicum lineale, kōlea (Myrsine spp.), Stenogyne campanulata, Lobelia niihauensis, and Mann's bluegrass (Poa mannii).

== Conservation ==
It was discovered in 1991 and described as a new species in 1995. Only four individuals were found at that time; three of those were crushed by a boulder and died between 1995 and 1998, and the last was found dead in 2011. Pollen was found to be inviable, no fruit set was ever observed and all attempts at propagation, including by cross-pollination with H. distans, failed. It was later assessed as extinct by the International Union for Conservation of Nature in 2016, but three individuals were rediscovered in 2019 by the National Tropical Botanical Garden. The plants were growing out of a steep cliff and were found using drones.
