= Poa mannii =

Conservation status
- Critically Endangered (IUCN 3.1)

- Critically Imperiled (NatureServe)

Scientific classification
- Kingdom: Plantae
- Clade: Tracheophytes
- Clade: Angiosperms
- Clade: Monocots
- Clade: Commelinids
- Order: Poales
- Family: Poaceae
- Subfamily: Pooideae
- Genus: Poa
- Species: P. mannii

Binomial name
- Poa mannii Munro ex Hillebr.

Species of grass

Poa mannii is a rare species of grass known by the common names Mann's bluegrass and Olokele Gulch bluegrass. It is endemic to Hawaii, where it is limited to the island of Kauai. It is threatened by the loss and modification of its habitat. It is a federally listed endangered species of the United States.

There are three species of Poa native to Hawaii, and they are all endemic to Kauai. There are at least 13 populations of this species, totalling about 100 individuals. These populations are found on steep slopes and dripping wet cliffs in forests dominated by Metrosideros polymorpha and Acacia koa. The fact that it is limited to steep, inaccessible habitat suggests that like many other Kauaian plants, this grass has been eliminated from all other habitat types by feral goats, one of the major threats to the species. Other plants in the habitat include ahinahina (Artemisia australis), kookoolau (Bidens sandwicensis), iliau (Wilkesia gymnoxiphium), emoloa (Eragrostis variabilis), haiwale (Crytandra wawrae), heau (Exocarpos luteolus), kamakahala (Geniostoma helleri), kului (Nototrichium sp.), manono (Hedyotis terminalis), mokihana (Melicope anisata), pelea (Melicope barbigera), alaa (Planchonella sandwicensis), lama (Diospyros sandwicensis), kopiko (Psychotria mariniana), Kaua'i wild coffee (Psychotria greenwelliae), and kokio (Kokia kauaiensis).

Besides feral goats, the plant and its habitat are threatened by introduced species of plants, fire, hurricanes, and landslides.
