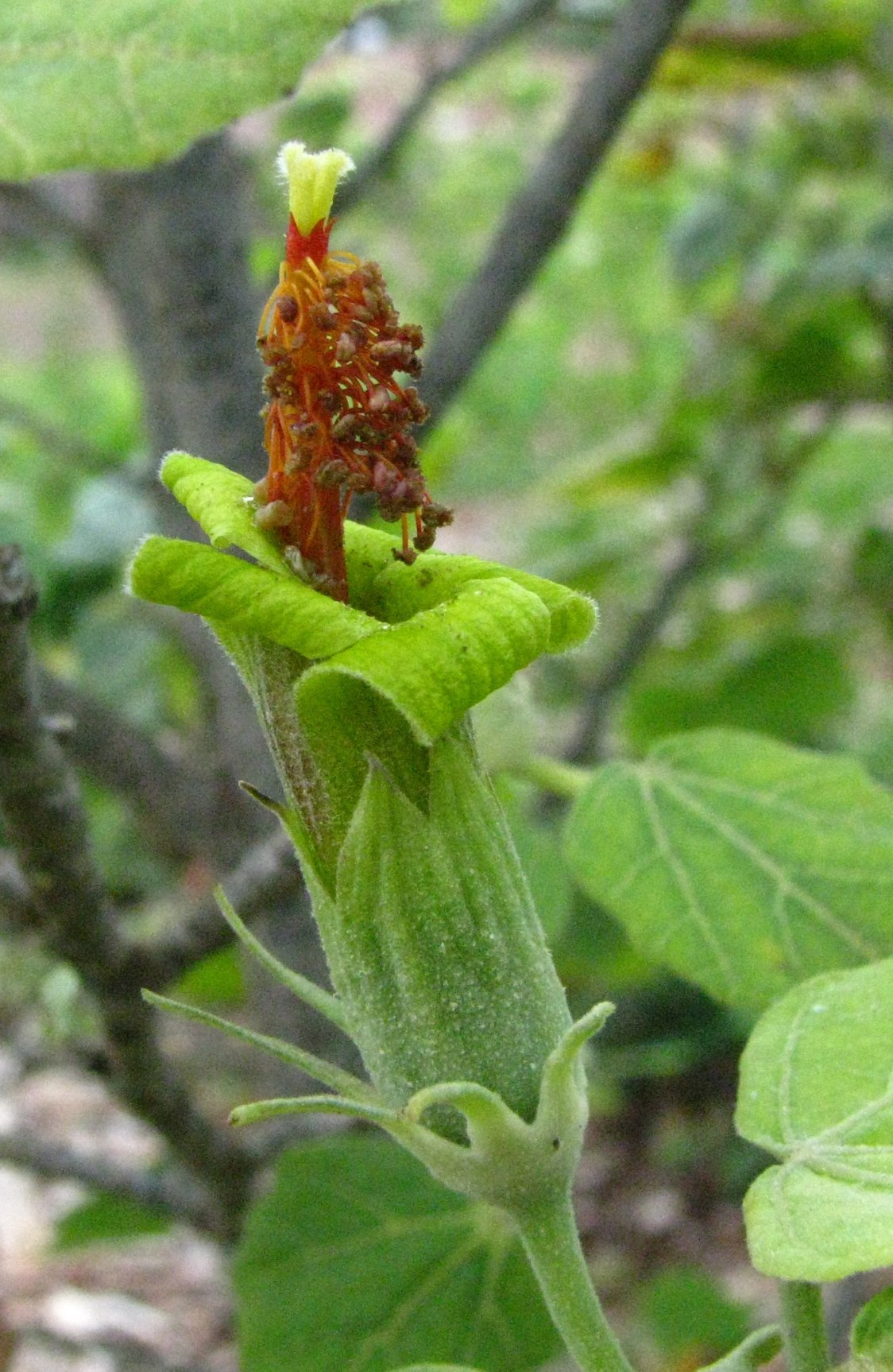

Conservation status
- Critically Endangered (IUCN 3.1)

Scientific classification
- Kingdom: Plantae
- Clade: Tracheophytes
- Clade: Angiosperms
- Clade: Eudicots
- Clade: Rosids
- Order: Malvales
- Family: Malvaceae
- Genus: Hibiscadelphus
- Species: H. distans

Binomial name
- Hibiscadelphus distans Bishop & Herbst, 1973

= Hibiscadelphus distans =

Species of tree

Hibiscadelphus distans (Kauai hau kuahiwi) is an extremely rare species of flowering plant in the mallow family, Malvaceae, that is endemic to the island of Kauaʻi in Hawaii. It is known as hau kuahiwi in Hawaiian, which means "upland Hibiscus tiliaceus." It is a bush or small tree with heart-shaped leaves and yellow flowers and grows at between 1,000 and 1,800 feet (300 and 550 m) in the remnants of native dry forests. Despite its rarity, it is believed to be the only surviving species in the genus Hibiscadelphus which is only known from Hawaii, the other five species having recently become extinct in the wild, some being known from only a single plant.

== Description ==
Hibiscadelphus distans is a shrub or small tree up to 5 m (16 ft) tall with smooth bark and a rounded crown. The heart-shaped leaves are 4–10 cm (1.6–3.9 in) in length and have rounded serrations on the margins and stellate trichomes (star-shaped hairs) on the upper on lower surfaces. The flowers are 3–4 cm (1.2–1.6 in) long and surrounded by triangular bracts. The sepals form a calyx tube around the greenish yellow petals, which turn maroon as they age. The fruit is a 2.5 cm (1 in) long, 1.5 cm (1 in) wide capsule that is divided into five sections. Each section contains two seeds around 5 mm (0.20 in) long. The capsule dehisces when mature, releasing the seeds.

== Habitat ==
Hau kuahiwi is found within low to mid-elevations, between 1,000 and 1,800 feet (300 and 550 m) in highly degraded remnants of native dry forests. The substrate is basaltic bedrock overlain by dry, crumbly red-brown soil. The current population exists in the Lower Koaiʻe Canyon, a tributary of Waimea Canyon, at an elevation of roughly 350 m (1,150 ft). Mean temperature in this habitat ranges from 18.5 to 25.7 °C (65.3 to 78.3 °F) and average annual rainfall is 150 cm (59 in). Associated plants include kukui (Aleurites moluccana), ʻāhinahina (Artemisia kauaiensis), alaheʻe (Psydrax odorata), lama (Diospyros sandwicensis), nehe (Lipochaeta connata), kōlea (Myrsine spp.), kuluʻī (Nototrichium sandwicense), ʻālaʻa (Planchonella sandwicensis), Sacramento Bur (Triumfetta semitriloba) and āulu (Sapindus oahuensis).

== Conservation ==
There are only two known naturally occurring populations of H. distans, both in the Lower Koaiʻe Canyon area, Puʻu Ka Pele Forest Reserve, with an estimated 20 wild and 150 reintroduced trees. The original population, found in 1972, was located in Koaiʻe Canyon within the State-owned Nā Pali Kona Forest Reserve. In 1989, this population was destroyed by a landslide. A second population of fifty trees in the Hipalau Valley was destroyed in 1992 by Hurricane Iniki. Two botanical gardens in Hawaii have cultivated this plant species: McBryde Garden (National Tropical Botanical Garden) on Kauaʻi and Waimea Valley on Oʻahu.

Despite the extreme rarity of H. distans, it actually has the largest wild population of any Hibiscadelphus species. Five of the other six species are extinct or extinct in the wild (four were only ever known from a single wild tree), the exception being H. woodii (also from Kauaʻi), which is known from only four individuals.
