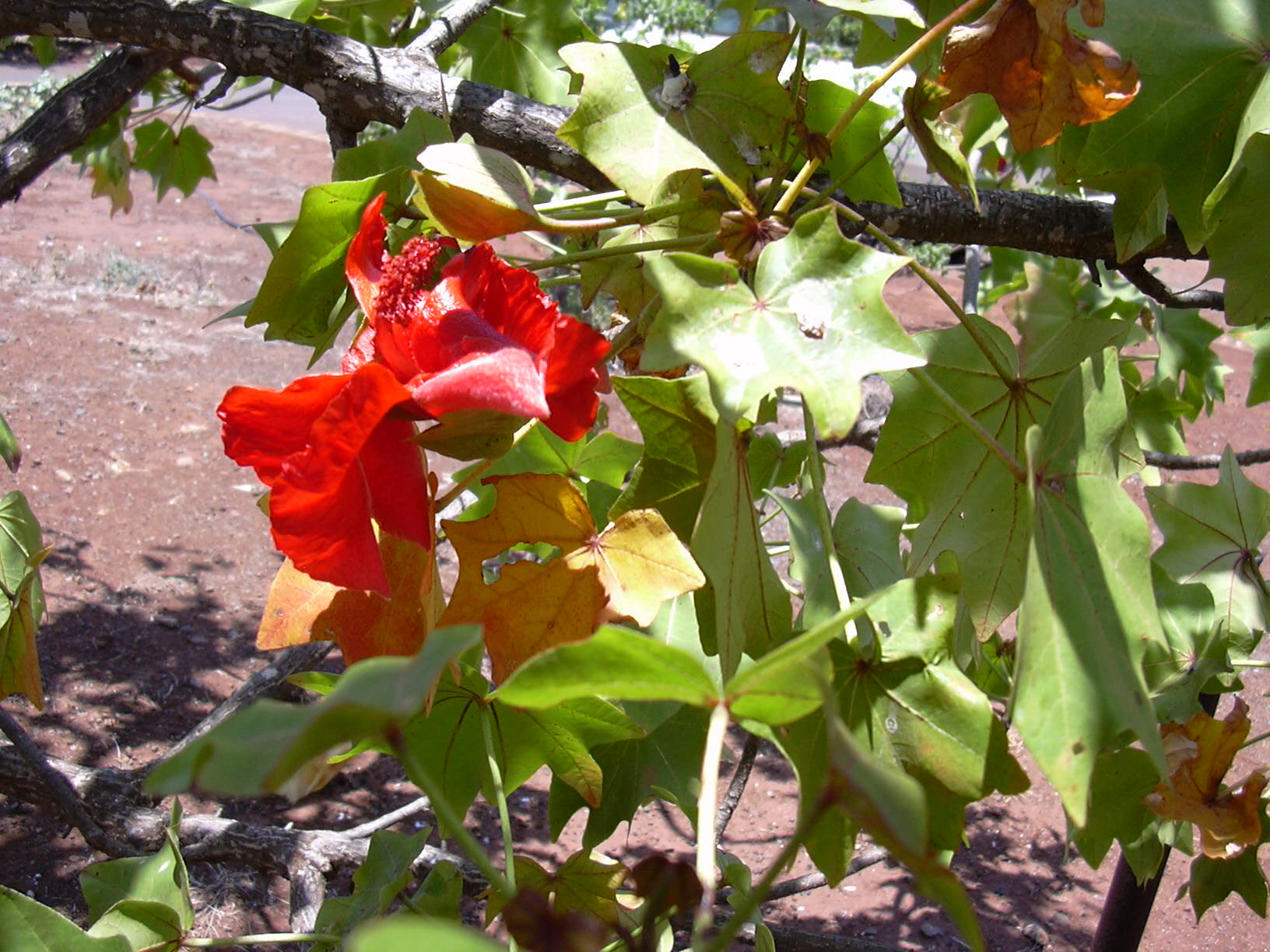
- Kokia cookei

Scientific classification
- Kingdom: Plantae
- Clade: Tracheophytes
- Clade: Angiosperms
- Clade: Eudicots
- Clade: Rosids
- Order: Malvales
- Family: Malvaceae
- Subfamily: Malvoideae
- Tribe: Gossypieae
- Genus: Kokia; Lewton

Species
- See text

= Kokia (plant) =

Genus of flowering plants

Kokia, with the common name treecotton, is a genus of flowering plants in the mallow family, Malvaceae.

All species within the genus are endemic to the Hawaiian Islands in the state of Hawaii.

== Species ==
- Kokia cookei O.Deg. - Molokaʻi treecotton (Molokaʻi)
- Kokia drynarioides (Seem.) Lewton - Hawaiian treecotton Island of Hawaiʻi
- Kokia kauaiensis (Rock) O.Deg. & Duvel - Kauaʻi Kokiʻo (Kauaʻi)
- †Kokia lanceolata Lewton
