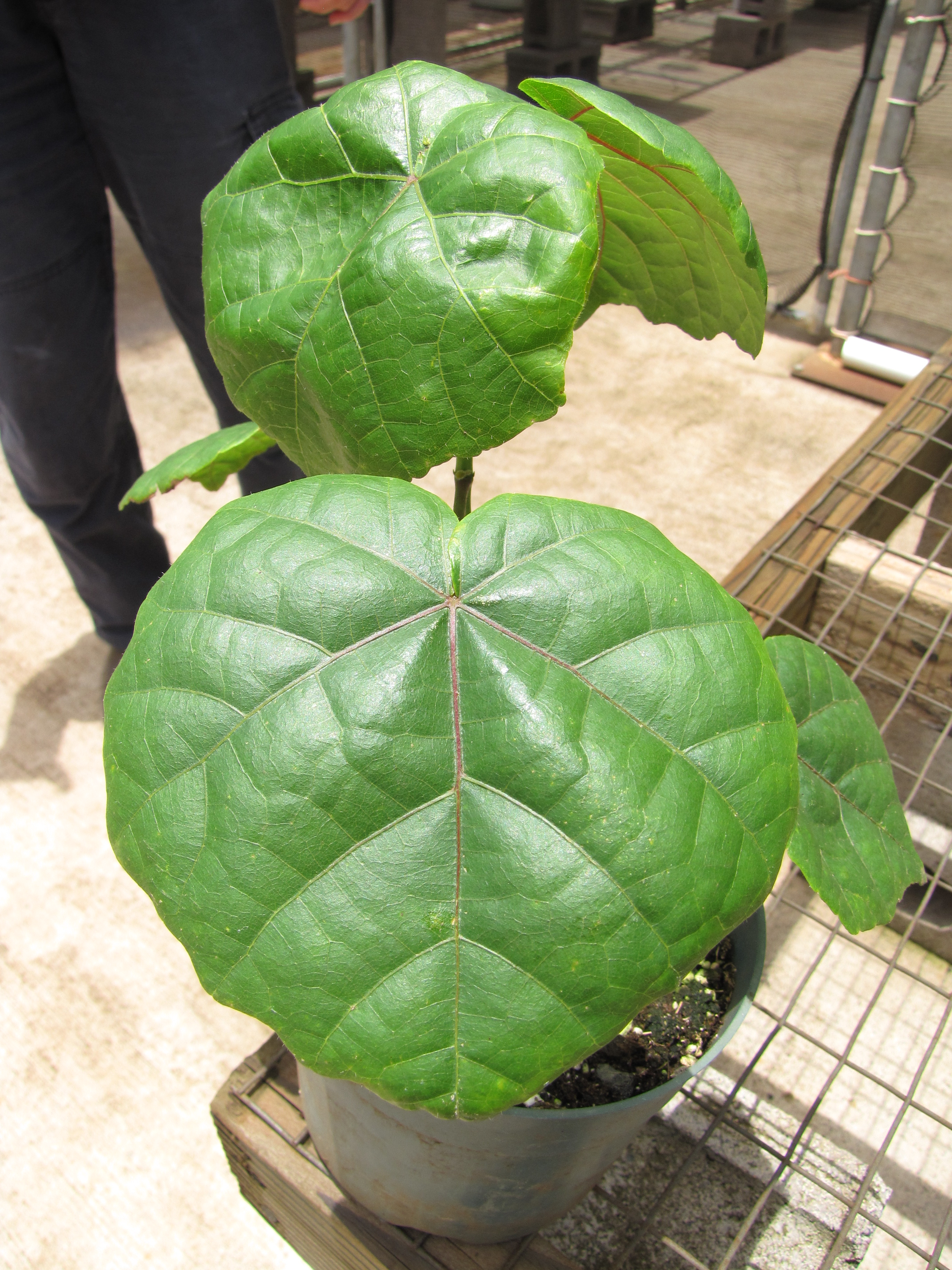

Conservation status
- Critically Endangered (IUCN 2.3)

- Possibly Extinct (NatureServe)

Scientific classification
- Kingdom: Plantae
- Clade: Tracheophytes
- Clade: Angiosperms
- Clade: Eudicots
- Clade: Rosids
- Order: Malvales
- Family: Malvaceae
- Genus: Hibiscadelphus
- Species: H. hualalaiensis

Binomial name
- Hibiscadelphus hualalaiensis Rock

= Hibiscadelphus hualalaiensis =

Species of tree

Hibiscadelphus hualalaiensis (Hualalai hau kuahiwi) is a species of flowering plant in the mallow family Malvaceae that is endemic to the Big Island of Hawaii.

== Description ==
H. hualalaiensis is a small tree, reaching a height of 5–7 m (16–23 ft) and trunk diameter of 30 cm (12 in).

== Distribution and habitat ==
It inhabits dry and mixed mesic forests on the slopes of Hualālai at elevations of 915–1,020 m (3,002–3,346 ft). Associated plants include ʻōhiʻa lehua (Metrosideros polymorpha), lama (Diospyros sandwicensis), māmane (Sophora chrysophylla), naio (Myoporum sandwicense), ʻālaʻa (Planchonella sandwicensis), pāpala (Charpentiera spp.), ʻaiea (Nothocestrum spp.), poʻolā (Claoxylon sandwicense), and Kikuyu grass (Pennisetum clandestinum).

== Conservation ==
The last known plant died in 1992, making it most likely extinct in the wild; any remaining plants are threatened by habitat loss. However, individuals have been breed in captivity and replanted in nature reserves of the Big Island.
