= Charles Noyes Forbes =

American botanist

- Born: September 24, 1883; Boylston, Massachusetts
- Died: August 9, 1920 (aged 36); Honolulu, Hawaii
- Education: University of California
- Known for: Field work and plant collecting in Hawaii
- Scientific career
- Fields: botany
- Workplaces: Bishop Museum
- Author abbrev. (botany): C.N.Forbes

Charles Noyes Forbes (September 24, 1883 – August 9, 1920) was an American botanist who primarily worked on Hawaii.

== Early life ==
Forbes was born in Boylston, Massachusetts, on September 24, 1883. He was the oldest child of Edmund Cushing Forbes. His siblings were sister Carrie Hyde Forbes, born 1884, brother Edmund Cushing Forbes Jr., born 1891, step-sister Ruth Persis Forbes, born 1900, and step-brother James Eli Forbes, born 1903 (two other step-brothers, Robert Long Forbes and Donald Long Forbes, died in infancy).

After finishing the elementary school Charles attended the Ray School in Southborough, Massachusetts, from 1895 to 1897 and afterwards the high school at National City, California. In 1904, he joined the University of California where he graduated to Bachelor of Science in 1908. While being an undergraduate he worked as a cadet for the emergency service during the 1906 San Francisco earthquake. During his senior year, on December 30, 1907, in Cedar Cañon, San Diego County, California, Forbes discovered a new species of cypress tree.

== Career ==
From 1908 to 1920 he was curator of Botany at the Bishop Museum in Honolulu. During that time he made several expeditions to the bogs, cliffs, mountain ranges and valleys in the Hawaiian islands and collected many plant taxa which were new to science. In 1919 he was the first botanist who explored the flora of the Haleakalā bog in eastern Maui. Among the plants which were scientifically described by Forbes are several which are either very rare or even extinct, including Portulaca molokiniensis, Cyanea parvifolia, Hibiscadelphus bombycinus and Clermontia tuberculata. The International Plant Names Index listed 52 taxa described by Forbes. Species such as Pipturus forbesii and Cheirodendron forbesii were named in his honour.

=== Legacy ===
In 1922, Willis Linn Jepson, then a full professor at the university and President of the California Botanical Society, named the new species Forbes discovered during his senior year, Cupressus forbesii, in memory of his former student. The species has recently been reclassified as Hesperocyparis forbesii.

== Personal life ==
In 1913, Forbes married Helen Jean ("Nell") Stokes (1884–1961), whom he had met the previous year during an extended visit to Hawaii from her home in Australia to see her brother, John F. G. Stokes, the museum's curator of Polynesian Ethnology. She was the daughter of Henry Edward Stokes and Clara Maude (née Josephson) Stokes. The couple had three children:

- Mary Noyes Forbes (1914–2010), who married Gerald Arthur Dolan, in 1937.
- Helen Jean Forbes (1916–2006), who married Howard Hiilani Adams, a son of Howard Whartenby Adams, in 1937.
- Douglas Gray Forbes (1918–1998), who married Vera Marie (née Chvany) Hussey.

Forbes died, at age 36, on August 9, 1920, in Honolulu.
