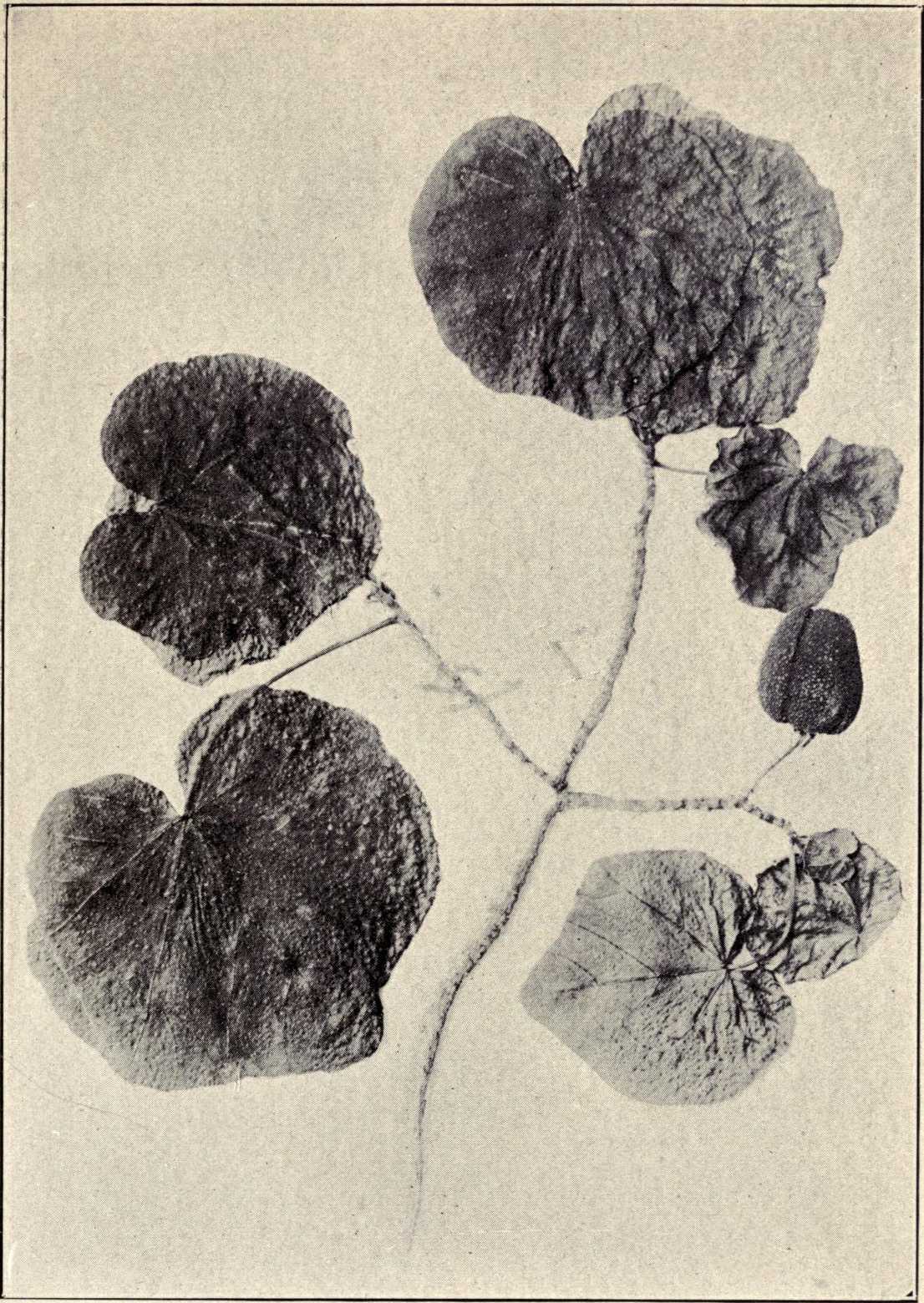

Conservation status
- Extinct (1912) (IUCN 2.3)

- Possibly Extinct (NatureServe)

Scientific classification
- Kingdom: Plantae
- Clade: Tracheophytes
- Clade: Angiosperms
- Clade: Eudicots
- Clade: Rosids
- Order: Malvales
- Family: Malvaceae
- Genus: Hibiscadelphus
- Species: †H. wilderianus

Binomial name
- †Hibiscadelphus wilderianus Rock

= Hibiscadelphus wilderianus =

Extinct species of flowering plant

Hibiscadelphus wilderianus, also known as the Maui hau kuahiwi, is an extinct species of flowering plant in the family Malvaceae that was endemic to the island of Maui in Hawaii.

In 2019, American biotechnology company Ginkgo Bioworks recreated the scent of Hibiscadelphus wilderianus's flower for a commercial fragrance line using DNA sequenced from the sole existing herbarium specimen.

== Taxonomy ==
It was described in 1911 by Austrian-American botanist Joseph Rock, based on his discovery in 1910 of the type specimen, a single tree on the southern slope of Haleakalā. The species name, wilderianus, was given in honor of Rock's friend Gerrit P. Wilder for his interest in growing and producing different varieties of Hibiscus. Wilder also collected the first open flowers from the type specimen, which formed the basis for the scientific description.

In 1973, L. Earl Bishop and Derral Herbst suggested that Hibiscadelphus wilderianus and Hibiscadelphus giffardianus may be variants of the same species due to their high morphological similarity. However, the status of the two species (being extinct and extinct in the wild, respectively) makes further study by comparing wild populations impossible.

== Description ==
Hibiscadelphus wilderianus was a small tree, growing to about 5 meters (16 feet) in height. The leaves were pubescent and rounded, with three lobes and five distinct palmately-arranged veins. It bore singular flowers with yellow petals on 4 centimeter (1.5 inch) long peduncles, and produced oval-shaped, roughly-textured woody capsule fruits.

== Distribution and habitat ==
Hibiscadelphus wilderianus's type specimen was found at 800 meters (2,265 feet) elevation in the dry forest lava fields of Auwahi on the rocky, dry southern slopes of Mount Haleakalā on Maui. Being on the leeward side of Mount Haleakalā, this region is relatively arid, receiving only 20 to 60 inches of rainfall annually.

== Extinction ==
The habitat of Hibiscadelphus wilderianus, the dry forest lava fields on Haleakalā's southern slope, has been severely deforested for use by cattle ranchers, and very few pockets of remnant native vegetation remain today. Remaining forest also faces substantial pressure from fire, browsing and grazing by introduced ungulates (such as cattle, goats, and feral pigs), and invasion by introduced grasses and other plant species.

Hibiscadelphus wilderianus's flower morphology, like that of other Hibiscadelphus, suggests that it would have relied upon the Hawaiian honeycreepers for pollination. The loss of its primary pollinators caused by the decline and extinction of many species of Hawaiian honeycreepers, then, would have contributed to the declines and potential coextinctions of Hibiscadelphus species, including Hibiscadelphus wilderianus.

The type specimen died within a few years of discovery. When it was revisited in 1912, it was covered in lichen (believed to have been Usnea australis) and in decline. Gerrit Wilder, for whom the plant was named, was able to collect some seed from the tree in 1912, and reportedly successfully raised a single seedling. However, Wilder believed that the area's use for cattle ranching meant that the extinction of the species was inevitable.

Given the destruction of much of its natural habitat and the death around 1912 of the sole known tree, Hibiscadelphus wilderianus is presumed to be extinct.
