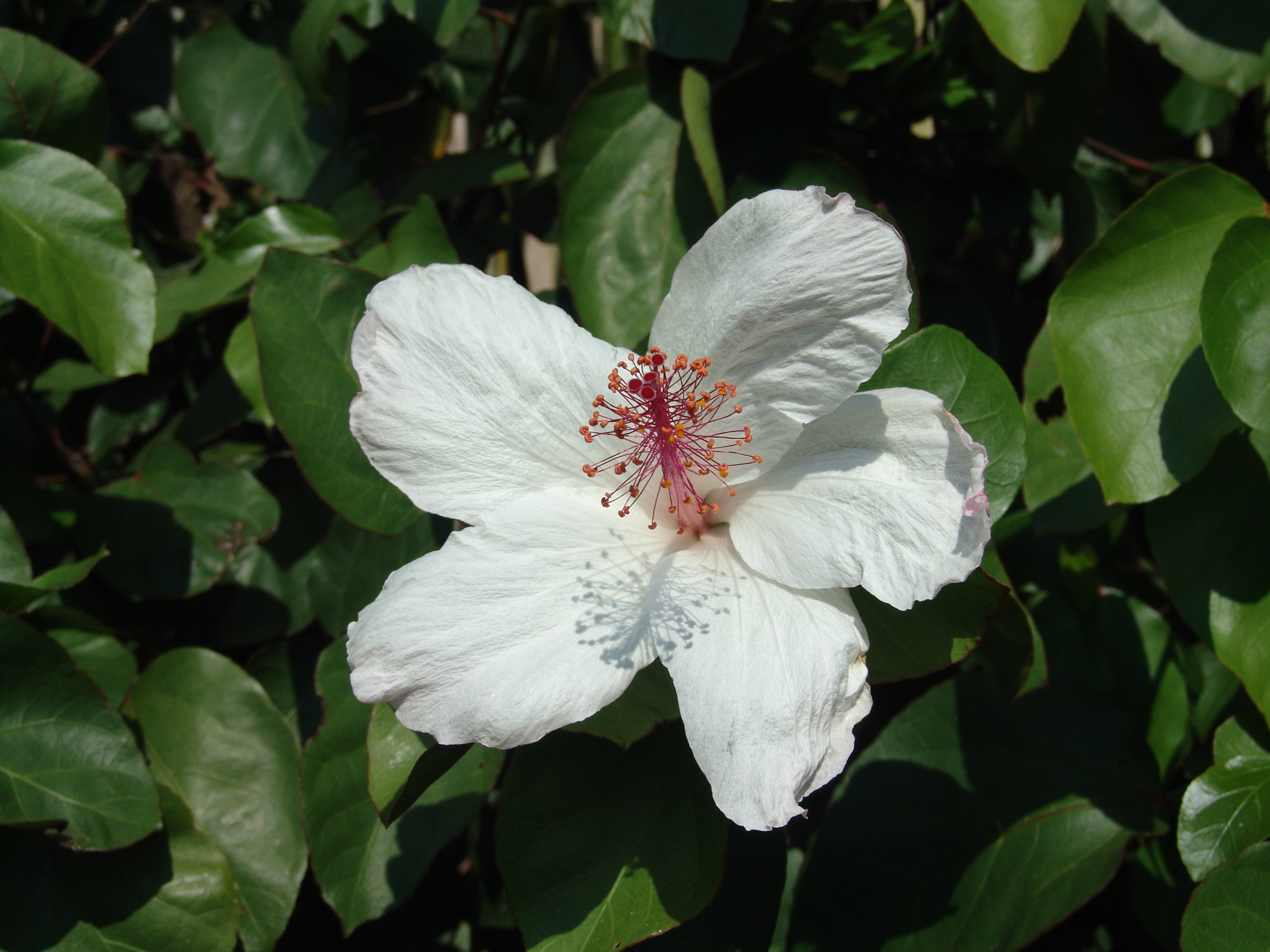

Conservation status
- Endangered (IUCN 3.1)

Scientific classification
- Kingdom: Plantae
- Clade: Tracheophytes
- Clade: Angiosperms
- Clade: Eudicots
- Clade: Rosids
- Order: Malvales
- Family: Malvaceae
- Genus: Hibiscus
- Species: H. arnottianus

Binomial name
- Hibiscus arnottianus A.Gray

Subspecies
- Hibiscus arnottianus subsp. arnottianus; Hibiscus arnottianus subsp. immaculatus (M.J.Roe) D.M.Bates; Hibiscus arnottianus subsp. punaluuensis (Skottsb.) D.M.Bates

= Hibiscus arnottianus =

Species of flowering plant

Hibiscus arnottianus is a species of flowering plant in the mallow family Malvaceae. It is a shrub or small tree native to the islands of Oahu and Molokai in the Hawaiian Islands, where it grows in tropical rainforest.

The species is threatened by competition with invasive non-native plants and by predation and habitat degradation by introduced animals. Invasive plants alter its native habitat and compete for space, light, moisture, and nutrients. feral pigs (Sus domesticus), goats (Capra hircus), and axis deer (Axis axis) damage plants and degrade the species' habitat by excessive browsing, trampling, and rooting for food. Introduced rats (Rattus rattus) and introduced slugs and snails feed on plant parts and fruits. The species is also threatened by landslides, fire, and drought, which are worsened by habitat degradation. The species is assessed as endangered in the IUCN Red List.

Three subspecies are accepted.

- Hibiscus arnottianus subsp. arnottianus (synonym Hibiscus boryanus Hook. & Arn.) – native to the Waiʻanae Range of Oahu from 120 to 790 meters elevation. Subspecies arnottianus is assessed as endangered by the IUCN.
- Hibiscus arnottianus subsp. immaculatus (M.J.Roe) D.M.Bates (synonym Hibiscus immaculatus M.J.Roe) – native to eastern Molokai, including the Waihanau and Papalaua valleys, from 300 to 800 meters elevation. Subspecies immaculatus is assessed as critically endangered by the IUCN.
- Hibiscus arnottianus subsp. punaluuensis (Skottsb.) D.M.Bates (synonym Hibiscus punaluuensis (Skottsb.) O.Deg. & I.Deg.) – native to the Koolau Range of eastern Oahu from 120 to 790 meters elevation. Subspecies punaluuensis is assessed as endangered by the IUCN.
