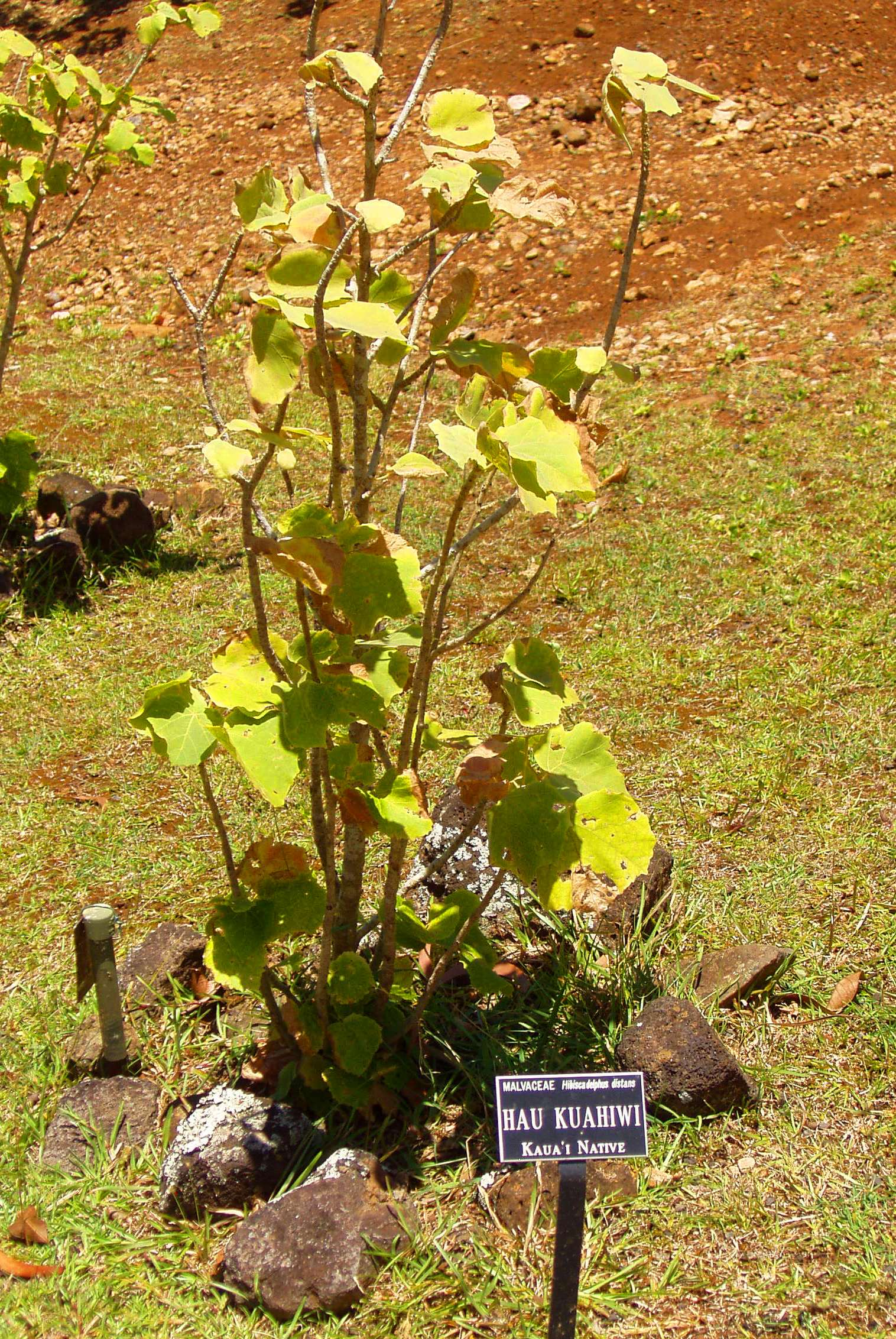
- Hibiscadelphus distans

Scientific classification
- Kingdom: Plantae
- Clade: Tracheophytes
- Clade: Angiosperms
- Clade: Eudicots
- Clade: Rosids
- Order: Malvales
- Family: Malvaceae
- Subfamily: Malvoideae
- Tribe: Hibisceae
- Genus: Hibiscadelphus; Rock, 1911

= Hibiscadelphus =

Genus of flowering plants

Hibiscadelphus is a genus of flowering plants that are endemic to Hawaiʻi. It is known by the Native Hawaiians as hau kuahiwi which means "mountain Hibiscus". The Latin name Hibiscadelphus means "brother of Hibiscus". It is distinctive for its peculiar flowers, which do not fully open. Hibiscadelphus is in the family Malvaceae, subfamily Malvoideae. Several of the species in this small genus are presumed extinct, as a result of coextinction with their primary pollinators, the Hawaiian honeycreepers.

== Description ==
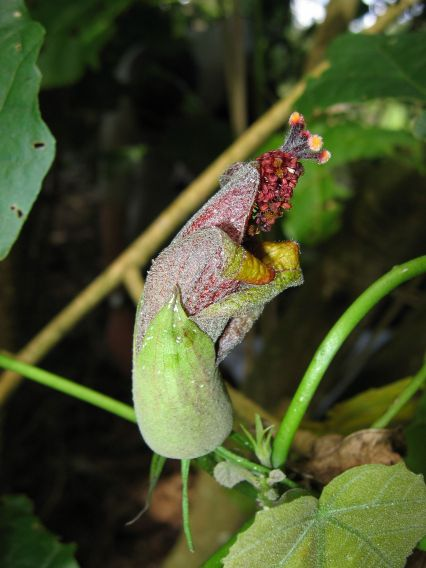
Flower of Hibiscadelphus giffardianus, showing the unusual "unopened" flower

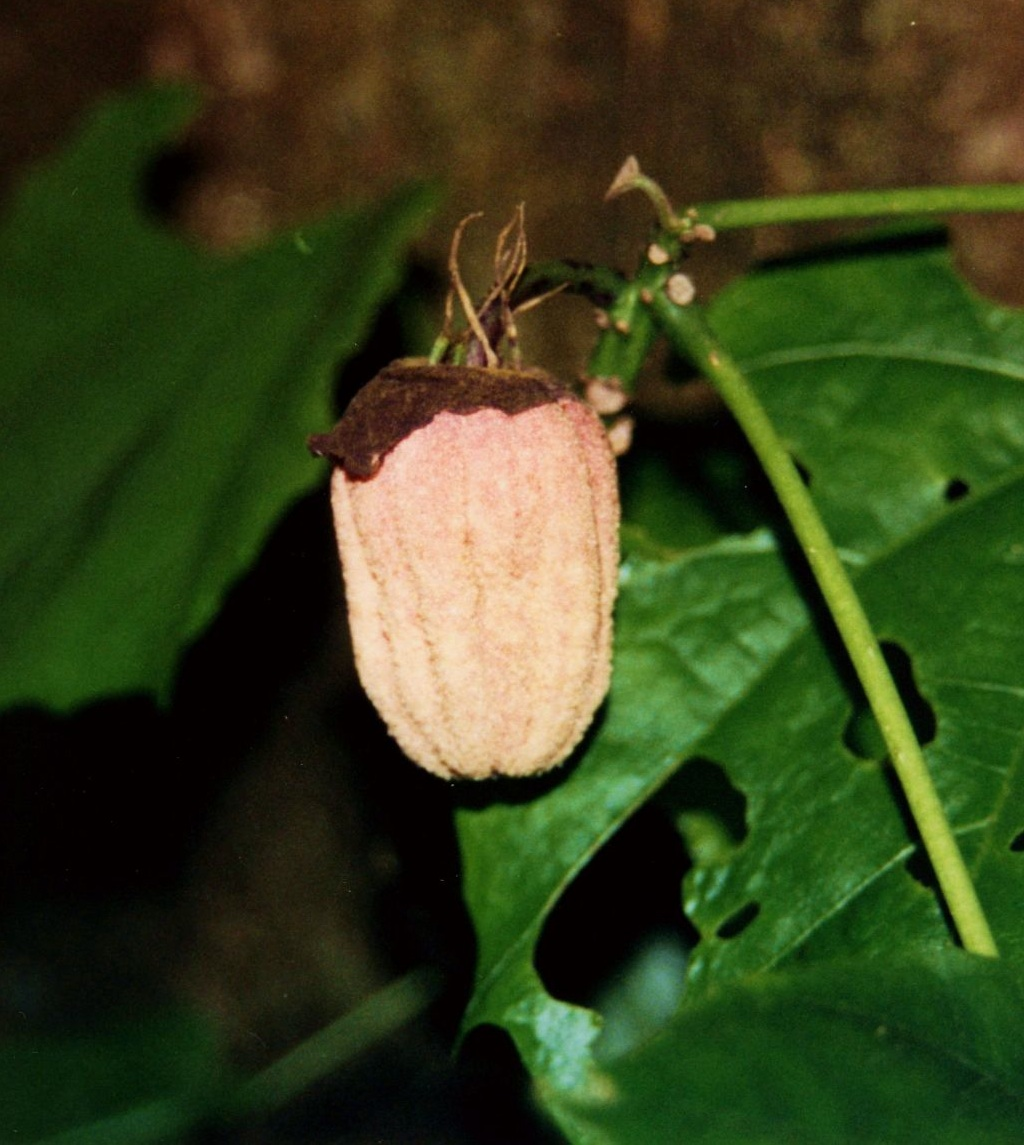
Fruit of H. giffardianus

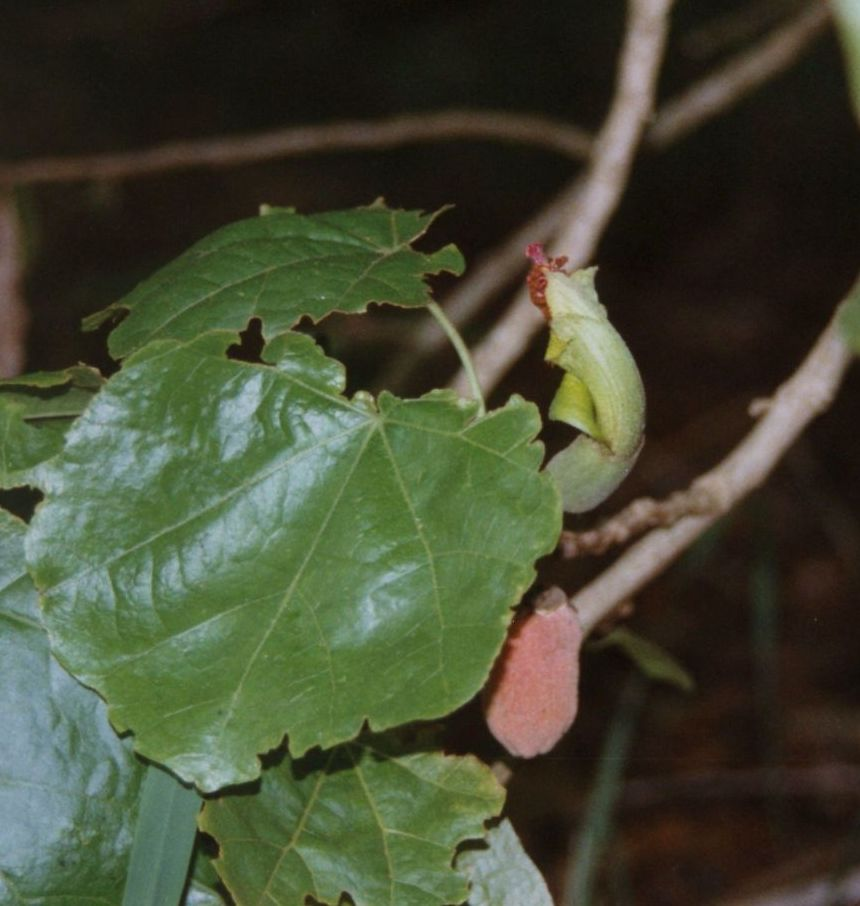
Flower of H. x puakuahiwi, possibly the last tree. It has the large flowers of H. giffardianus but the yellow color of H. hualalaiensis.

Hibiscadelphus was first described by Austrian-American botanist Joseph Rock in 1911 on the basis of the species Hibiscadelphus giffardianus. Species in this genus are large shrubs or small trees, up to 7 metres (23 ft) tall, with nearly circular leaves. The genus is characterized by flowers that never open to the flat form of Hibiscus, but remain folded together in a tubular form. This is presumed to be an adaptation to pollination by honeycreepers. The fruits are rough capsules containing up to 15 hairy seeds.

The lateness of its discovery by western botanists indicates that Hibiscadelphus was already rare by the time Europeans arrived in Hawaiʻi. Four species - H. bombycinus, H. crucibracteatus, H. giffardianus, and H. wilderianus - were only ever known from a single individual in the wild. Today, four of the known species are extinct, two are extinct in the wild and persist only in cultivation, and only one (H. distans) has a small, highly endangered wild population. Although it has been suggested that poor pollination due to extinction of their honeycreeper pollinators is a factor, the abundant fruits and high germination rates of at least some species argues against this. The main reason is probably feeding on seeds by rats. This fits with a decline of the group that began long before the arrival of cats, mosquitoes, and avian malaria decimated honeycreeper populations, since the Polynesian rat arrived with the early Hawaiian settlers. The widespread destruction of dry forests, both before and after European contact, was also a major factor.

== Hibiscadelphus species ==
- Hibiscadelphus distans - Less than 200 wild individuals occur above the Koaiʻe River on Kauaʻi, but it sets abundant, fertile seeds in cultivation.
- Hibiscadelphus giffardianus - In 1911 Joseph Rock discovered a single tree at Kīpuka Puaulu, now part of Hawaiʻi Volcanoes National Park. This tree died in 1930, but cuttings were saved. Several hundred individuals have since been planted in the park, but no natural regeneration has been observed and few trees produce viable seeds.
- Hibiscadelphus hualalaiensis - This species formerly occurred in North Kona. The last wild tree died in 1992, but it survives in cultivation and trees have been outplanted in forest reserves.
- Hibiscadelphus stellatus - recently described species. 99 wild individuals are known to occur in Kaua`ula valley in Western Maui.
- Hibiscadelphus woodii - This species was discovered in 1991, on Kauaʻi. Only four individuals were found at that time; three of those were crushed by a boulder and died between 1995 and 1998, and the last was found dead in 2011. Pollen was found to be inviable, no fruit set was ever observed and all attempts at propagation, including by cross-pollination with H. distans, failed. However, one individual was found on a cliffside in Kalalau Valley in January 2019, and a month later two more were found.
- Hibiscadelphus x puakuahiwi - A hybrid between H. giffardianus and H. hualalaiensis. In the 1960s both species were planted on Mauna Loa in Hawaiʻi Volcanoes National Park, where only the former occurred naturally. The two cross-pollinated, and the hybrid seeds were unknowingly collected and planted. When discovered in 1973 the hybrids and H. hualalaiensis trees were cut down, although at least one hybrid remains as of 2011.
- †Hibiscadelphus bombycinus - Known from only one collection, before 1868, from Kawaihae, Hawaiʻi.
- †Hibiscadelphus crucibracteatus - In 1981 a single tree was discovered on the slopes of the Puhielelu Ridge on Lānaʻi at an altitude of 750 metres (2,460 ft). This tree went extinct in 1985. Efforts to save the species failed because seeds did not germinate.
- †Hibiscadelphus wilderianus - Most likely extinct around 1912. Only known from a single tree which was discovered at Auwahi on Maui.
