= Isa Degener =

American botanist

Isa Irmgard Degener née Hansen (April 27, 1924, Berlin – April 13, 2018, Waialua, Hawaii) was a German-American plant collector and botanist, specializing in agrostology. She is known as the coauthor of Flora Hawaiiensis.

Isa Hansen studied botany at the University of Berlin and worked there as an assistant to Hermann Otto Sleumer and Erich Werdermann. Later she worked at the Berlin Botanical Garden and specialized in the grasses. In 1952 she met Otto Degener, who had come to Berlin in search of a grass expert. They began a correspondence and married in January 1953. The couple worked together, collecting botanical specimens in the Hawaiian Islands. They also made an important expedition to Polynesia. Otto and Isa Degener were associated with the New York Botanical Garden for many years. The New York Botanical Garden appointed Otto Degener as Collaborator of Hawaiian Botany in 1935 and appointed Isa Degener as Honorary Collaborator of Hawaiian Botany in 1975.

The pair focused on the flora of Hawaii and with her help, often as co-author, Otto Degener would publish 10 books and over 400 journal articles on that topic. Of greatest importance is the couple's New Illustrated Flora of the Hawaiian Islands or Flora Hawaiiensis which appeared in seven volumes between 1933 and 1957.

In 1964 Otto and Isa Degener went a trip around the world. They toured southern Japan, India, Egypt, Turkey, and Greece. In Europe they visited relatives, studied Hawaiian botanical specimens at Vienna's Naturhistorisches Museum, and went to Edinburgh for the 10th International Botanical Congress. Via Portugal and Spain, they went to New York City, where Otto Wegener did some work at the New York Botanical Garden before they returned to their home located on Mokuleia Beach.

The New York Botanical Garden has most of their herbarium material. The Hawaiian State Senate commended the Degeners for their conservation work.
