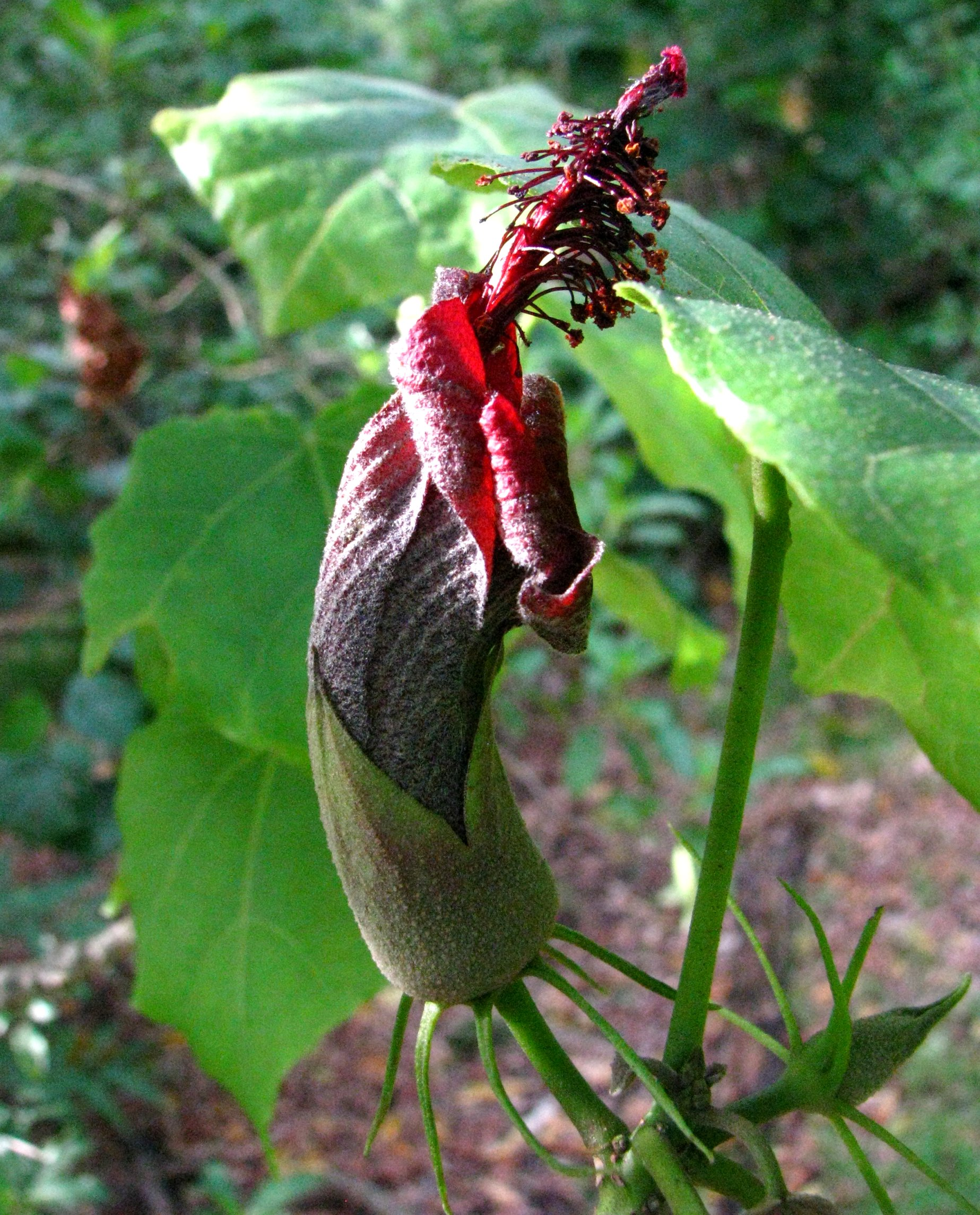

Conservation status
- Critically Endangered (IUCN 3.1)

- Possibly Extinct (NatureServe)

Scientific classification
- Kingdom: Plantae
- Clade: Tracheophytes
- Clade: Angiosperms
- Clade: Eudicots
- Clade: Rosids
- Order: Malvales
- Family: Malvaceae
- Genus: Hibiscadelphus
- Species: H. giffardianus

Binomial name
- Hibiscadelphus giffardianus Rock

= Hibiscadelphus giffardianus =

Species of tree

Hibiscadelphus giffardianus (Kilauea hau kuahiwi) is a species of flowering plant in the mallow family Malvaceae that is endemic to the Big Island of Hawaii.

== Description ==
H. giffardianus is a small tree, reaching a height of 7 m (23 ft) and trunk diameter of 30 cm (12 in).

== Conservation ==
It is sometimes believed to be extinct in the wild, with any remaining plants being threatened by habitat loss. Cultivated plants exist in Hawaii Volcanoes National Park, and certain captive-grown individuals have been replanted at the original site.

== Distribution and habitat ==
It inhabits mixed mesic forests on the slopes of Mauna Loa at elevations of 1,200–1,310 m (3,940–4,300 ft). Associated plants include ʻōhiʻa lehua (Metrosideros polymorpha), koa (Acacia koa), mānele (Sapindus saponaria), hoio (Diplazium sandwicianum), pilo (Coprosma spp.), māmaki (Pipturus albidus), kōpiko (Psychotria spp.), olopua (Nestegis sandwicensis), alani (Melicope spp.), ʻaʻaliʻi (Dodonaea viscosa), and naio (Myoporum sandwicense).
