= Frederick Lewis Lewton =

American botanist and historian (1874–1959)

- Born: March 17, 1874; Cleveland, Ohio, US
- Died: February 21, 1959 (aged 84); Orange County, Florida, US
- Scientific career
- Fields: Botany
- Author abbrev. (botany): Lewton

Frederick Lewis Lewton (1874–1959) was an American botanist, chemist, museum curator, archivist, and historian.

At the age of two, Lewton moved with his family to Winter Park, Florida. He studied from 1886 to 1890 at Rollins College. After attending an engineering school in Philadelphia for a year, he transferred to Drexel University. For some time he worked in Florida and briefly worked in Baltimore. From October 1895 to June 1896 he worked at Drexel University as an instructor in chemistry and a laboratory assistant in both chemistry and physics. In June 1896, Lewton became an economic botanist at the Philadelphia Commercial Museum. There he investigated over 500 specimens of gums and resins to determine their chemical compositions, solubilities, and botanical affiliations. This research was published in German and American scientific journals.

He then returned to school to take the Civil Service exam, and began his work as a scientific assistant of botany for the U.S. Department of Agriculture. While he was working, he attended George Washington University and graduated in 1922. He then went to the South and studied pests for eight years. After that he went to the United States National Museum and became curator of Textiles and Medicine.

Lewton and his first wife, Emilie Hempel Lewton (1875–1929), were married for thirty years and had four daughters. He and his second wife moved to Florida. From 1954 until his death in 1959 he worked as a part-time archivist and historian at Rollins College.

Lewton did research and wrote reports on strains of cotton which are resistant to boll-weevil infestation. His article The Servant in the House: A Brief History of the Sewing Machine is noteworthy in the history of technology.
