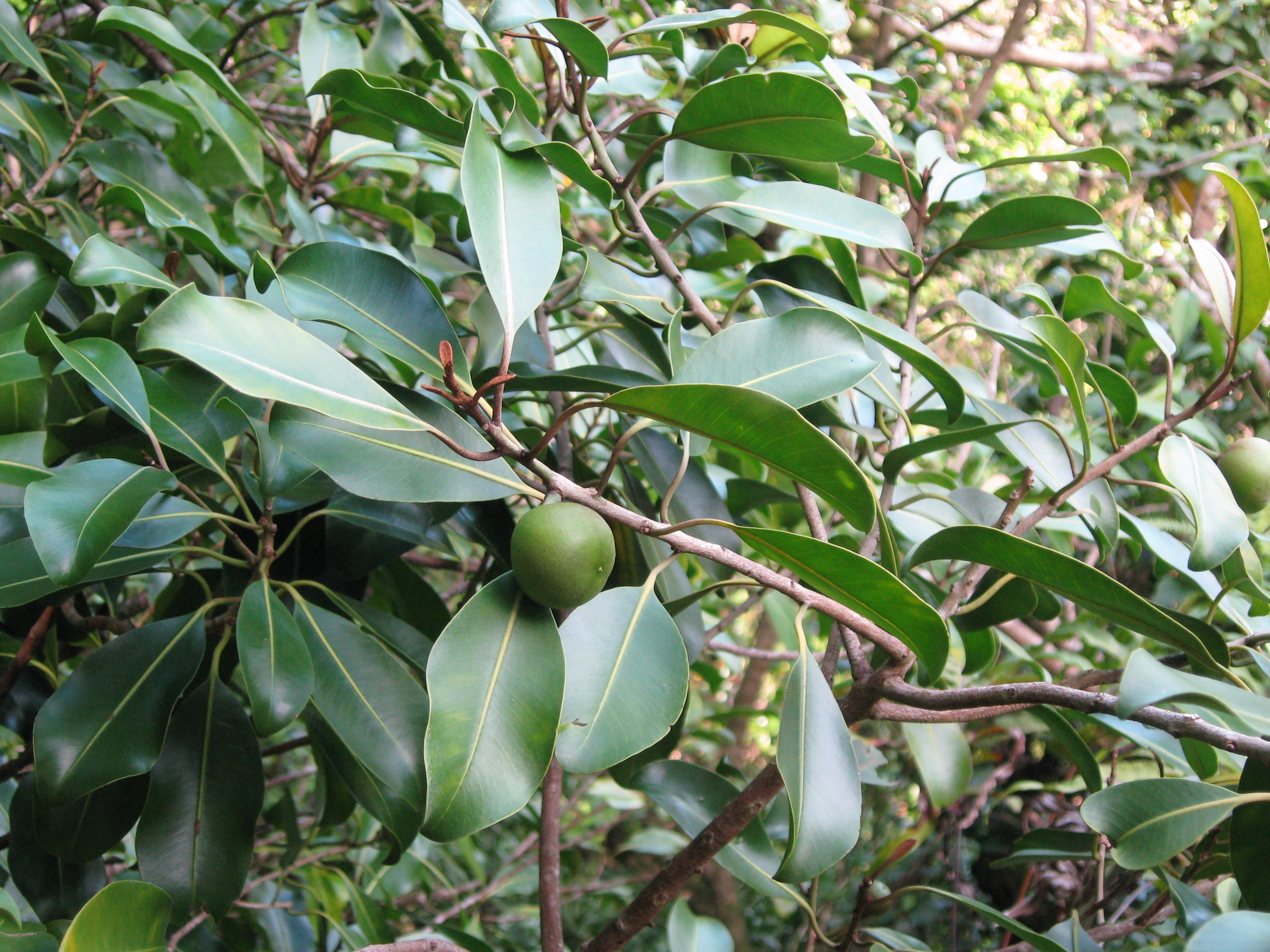
- Green fruit and leaves

Scientific classification
- Kingdom: Plantae
- Clade: Tracheophytes
- Clade: Angiosperms
- Clade: Eudicots
- Clade: Asterids
- Order: Ericales
- Family: Sapotaceae
- Genus: Planchonella
- Species: P. sandwicensis

Binomial name
- Planchonella sandwicensis (A.Gray) Pierre (1890)

Synonyms
- Planchonella ceresolii (Rock) H.St.John (1973), no basionym page.; Planchonella densiflora (Hillebr.) Pierre ex H.J.Lam (1942); Planchonella puulupensis Baehni & O.Deg. (1938); Planchonella rhynchosperma (Rock) H.St.John (1973), no basionym page.; Planchonella sandwicensis f. densiflora (Hillebr.) H.J.Lam (1942); Planchonella sandwicensis f. puulupensis (Baehni & O.Deg.) H.J.Lam (1942); Planchonella spathulata var. densiflora (Hillebr.) H.St.John (1973); Pouteria ceresolii (Rock) Fosberg (1962); Pouteria rhynchosperma (Rock) Fosberg (1962); Pouteria sandwicensis (A.Gray) Baehni & O.Deg. (1938); Pouteria sandwicensis f. densiflora (Hillebr.) Baehni (1942); Pouteria sandwicensis f. puulupensis (Baehni & O.Deg.) Baehni (1942); Sapota sandwicensis A.Gray (1862); Sideroxylon ceresolii Rock (1913); Sideroxylon rhynchospermum Rock (1910); Sideroxylon sandwicense (A.Gray) Benth. & Hook.f. ex Drake (1892); Sideroxylon sandwicense var. auratum Hillebr. (1888); Sideroxylon spathulatum var. densiflorum Hillebr. (1888)

= Planchonella sandwicensis =

Species of tree

Planchonella sandwicensis is a species of flowering tree in the sapodilla family, Sapotaceae, that is endemic to the main islands of Hawaii. Names for this species in the Hawaiian language include ʻĀlaʻa, Āulu and ʻĒlaʻa.

== Description ==
ʻĀlaʻa inhabits dry, coastal mesic, and mixed mesic forests at elevations of 240–980 m (790–3,220 ft). ʻĀlaʻa reaches a height of 15 m (49 ft) and a trunk diameter of 0.4 m (1.3 ft). The thick bark is grey and fissured, with an orange inner layer. The leaves are alternate, thick, leathery, oblong or elliptical, and measure 6–14 cm (2.4–5.5 in) long and 3–6 cm (1.2–2.4 in) wide. The upper surfaces of the leaves are glabrous and shiny green, while the lower surfaces are dull and may feature bronze or reddish brown pressed hairs. The hairs are sometimes found only on the tips of new leaves (see photo gallery below). Inflorescences with one to four bell-shaped flowers are found at the bases of leaves. The fruit, a berry, is 3–4 cm (1.2–1.6 in) in diameter and yellow, orange, or purplish black. Each fruit contains one to five seeds, which are about 2 cm (0.79 in) long and yellow brown.

== Uses ==
The wood of ʻālaʻa is yellow with black streaks, extremely hard, and close grained. Native Hawaiians used it in house construction and to make the pale (gunwales) of waʻa (outrigger canoes), ʻōʻō (digging sticks), and ihe (spears). The sticky, milky sap was used as a kolū (glue) for weapon and tool handles and as kēpau (birdlime), much like papala kepau (Pisonia spp.).

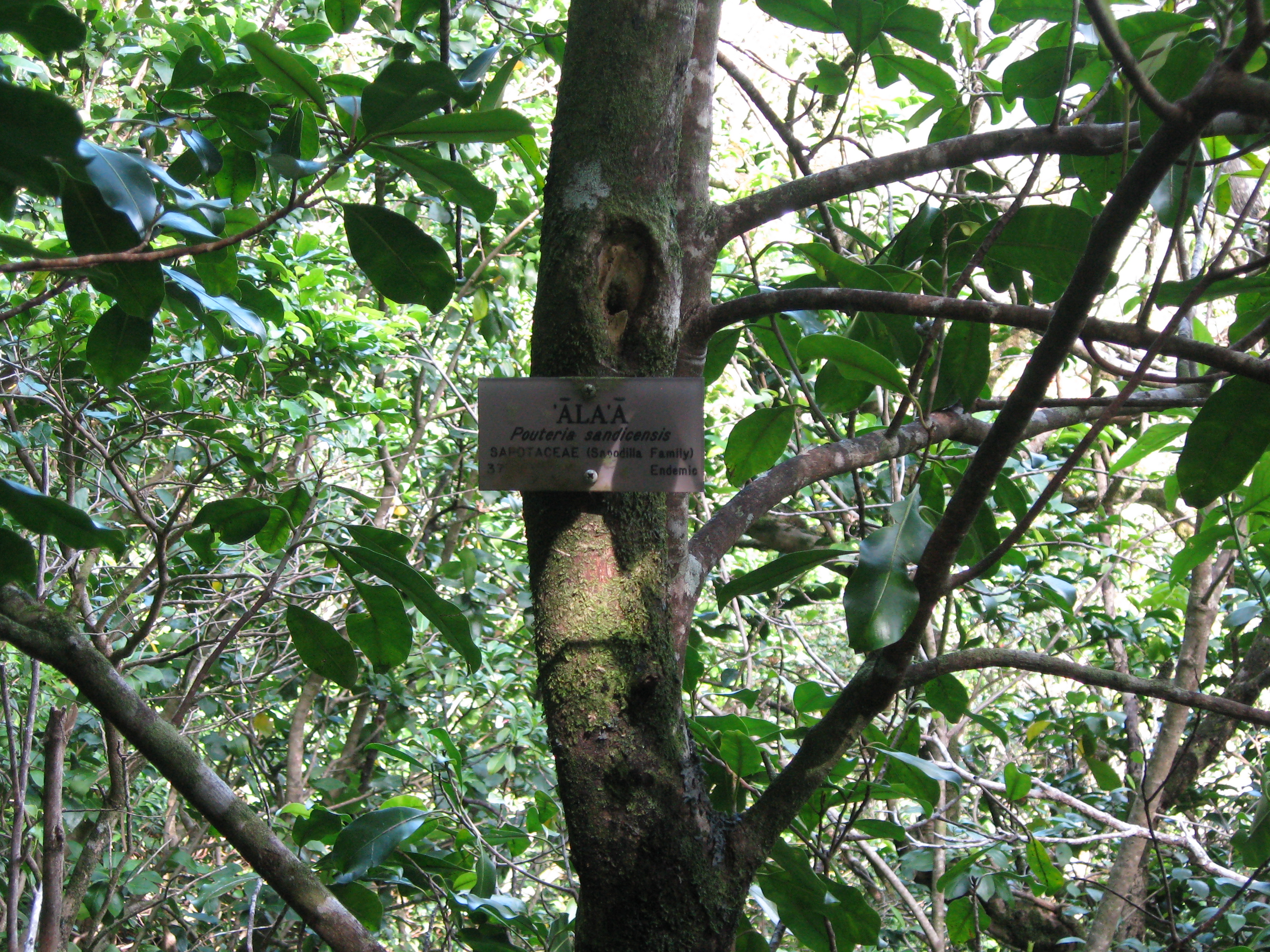
Planchonella sandwicensis trunk

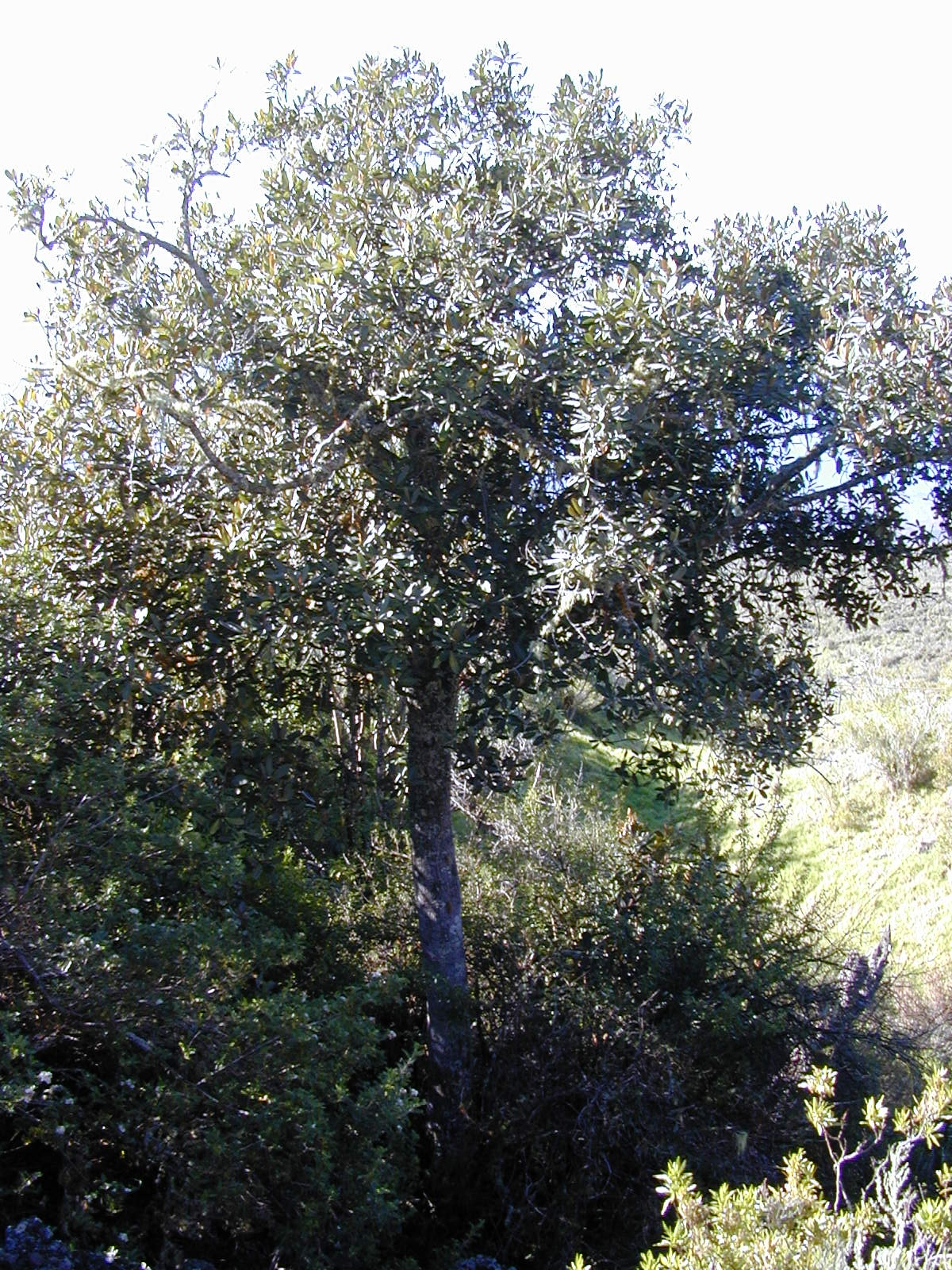
Pouteria sandwicensis (leaves)
