= Otto Degener =

American botanist (1899–1988)

Otto Degener (May 13, 1899 – January 16, 1988) was a botanist and conservationist who specialized in identifying plants of the Hawaiian Islands.

== Biography ==
Degener was born May 13, 1899, in East Orange, New Jersey. Degener graduated from the Massachusetts Agricultural College (now University of Massachusetts Amherst). Intending to spend a year as a tourist, he arrived in Hawaii but decided to stay. He received his MA from the University of Hawaiʻi in 1922 and his PhD from Columbia University. He taught botany at the University of Hawaiʻi from 1925 to 1927, and was the first naturalist for what are now Hawaii Volcanoes National Park and Haleakala National Park.

In 1932, Degener started the first book on Hawaiian plants published since that of William Hillebrand in 1888. It was titled Flora Hawaiiensis, and published in several volumes over his lifetime. On January 10, 1953, he married the botanist Isa Irmgard Hansen, whom he met in Berlin in 1952. They collected plants together in the Hawaiian archipelago. After 1956 Isa Degener was a coauthor for Flora Hawaiiensis. Amy B. H. Greenwell assisted in some of the volumes, and left her property as a botanical garden. He collected over 36,000 different species and preserved some 900 threatened and endangered plants. His specimens were left to the New York Botanical Garden.

Degener was guest botanist on the second Cheng Ho expedition, which lasted from 1940 to 1941 and was sponsored by Anne Mills Archbold. During about eight months he collected over 2,000 specimens from Fijian plants, which were sent to Albert Charles Smith and other specialists in the United States. In 1949 Degener published a book describing his travels and experiences in the Fiji Islands. The tree Degeneria vitiensis, which he discovered in Fiji in 1941, is named after him. He died January 16, 1988, in Honolulu, Hawaii.

Otto and Isa Degener were in Edinburgh in August 1964 for the 10th International Botanical Congress.

They were commended by the Hawaiian Senate for their conservation work. Many of the plants collected by Otto Degener belong to species that are now extinct.
