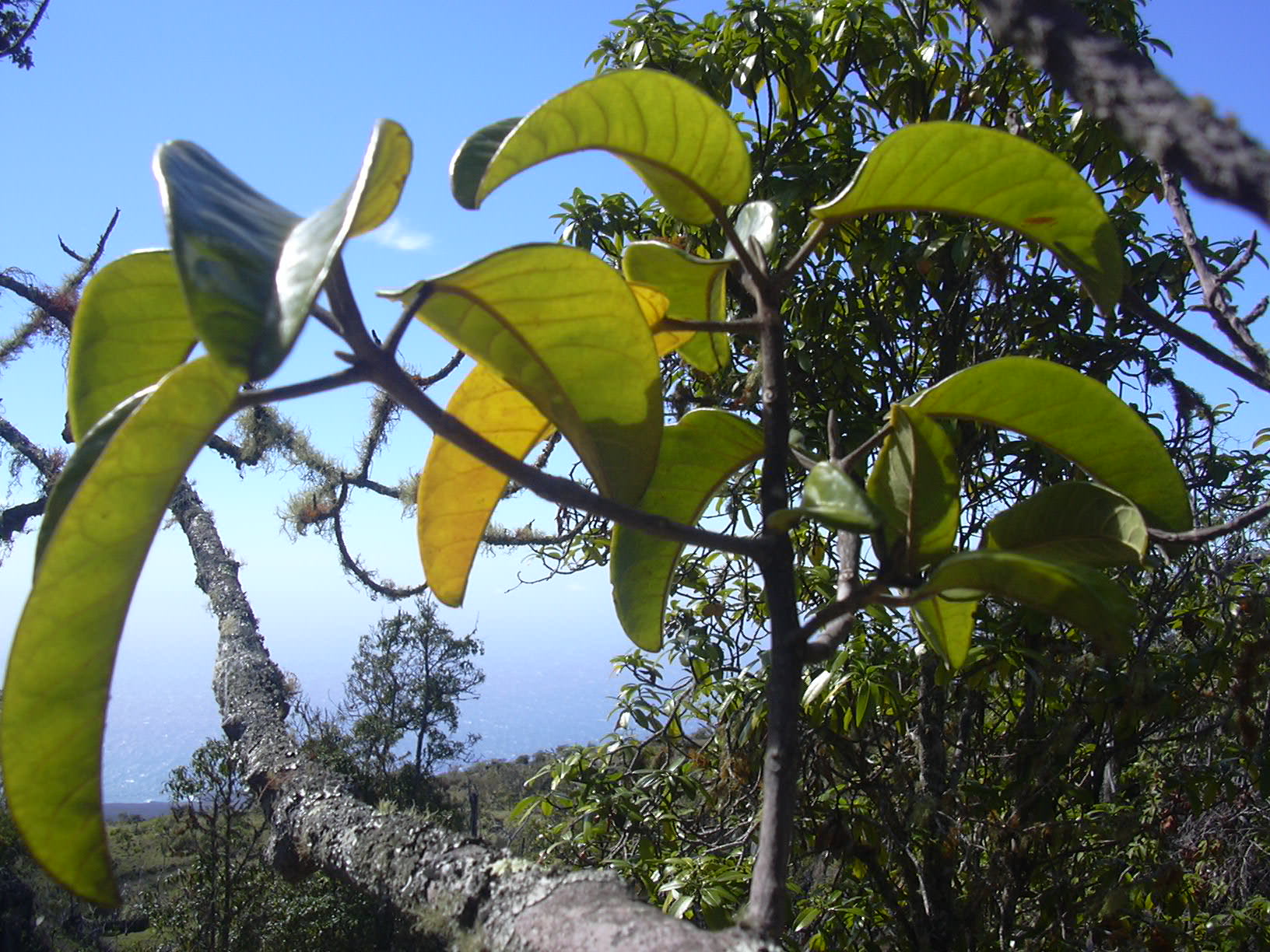

Conservation status
- Critically Endangered (IUCN 3.1)

Scientific classification
- Kingdom: Plantae
- Clade: Tracheophytes
- Clade: Angiosperms
- Clade: Eudicots
- Clade: Rosids
- Order: Sapindales
- Family: Rutaceae
- Genus: Melicope
- Species: M. knudsenii

Binomial name
- Melicope knudsenii (Hillebr.) T.G.Hartley & B.C.Stone

= Melicope knudsenii =

Species of flowering plant

Melicope knudsenii, commonly known as Olokele Valley melicope or Knudsen's melicope, is a species of flowering plant in the family Rutaceae, that is endemic to Hawaii. It is threatened by habitat loss. Like other Hawaiian Melicope, this species is known as alani. This is a federally listed endangered species of the United States.

== Description ==
M. knudsenii is described as trees that can reach up to 29.5 feet (9.0 m) tall, with large inflorescences containing up to 200 flowers each, bundled into auxiliary chymes up to 6 inches (15 cm) long. Its leaves are simple-shaped, with oblong–ovate to oblong–elliptic or elliptic blades up to 10 inches (25 cm) long and 4 inches (10 cm) wide. Its petioles are 20–60 mm long, with no stipules. Its fruit is 18–30 mm wide, with distinct follicles of 8–14 mm long, with seeds of 5–6 mm long, colored as glossy black when ripe, and ovoid (or sometimes angled) in shape.

== Habitat and distribution ==
It inhabits montane mesic forests dominated by Acacia koa, Metrosideros polymorpha, and Dicranopteris linearis on Kauaʻi (Olokele Valley and Waimea Canyon), and East Maui (Auwahi). Associated plants include Syzygium sandwicensis, Cheirodendron trigynum, Myrsine lessertiana, Ilex anomala, Alphitonia ponderosa, Zanthoxylum dipetalum, Kadua terminalis, Pleomele aurea, Bobea spp., Tetraplasandra waimeae, Xylosma hawaiensis, Eurya sandwicensis, Psychotria mariniana, Melicope anisata, Melicope barbigera, Planchonella sandwicensis, Dodonaea viscosa, and Dianella sandwicensis.

This tree is very rare today, existing only on the islands of Kauai and Maui in small numbers. It was reported that about a dozen trees were available in the 1970s. By 2008, there were three individuals remaining on Kauai. A 1999 survey reported only a single wild individual remaining on Maui, and another one being cultivated in an arboretum. The latter is producing seeds, which are being collected. The seedlings will be planted in appropriate habitat.

== Phylogeny ==
M. knudsenii, along with other Hawaiian Melicope species, came from the Pelea clade in the Acronychia–Melicope group, which originated during the Late and Middle Miocene (8.5–16.9 Ma).
