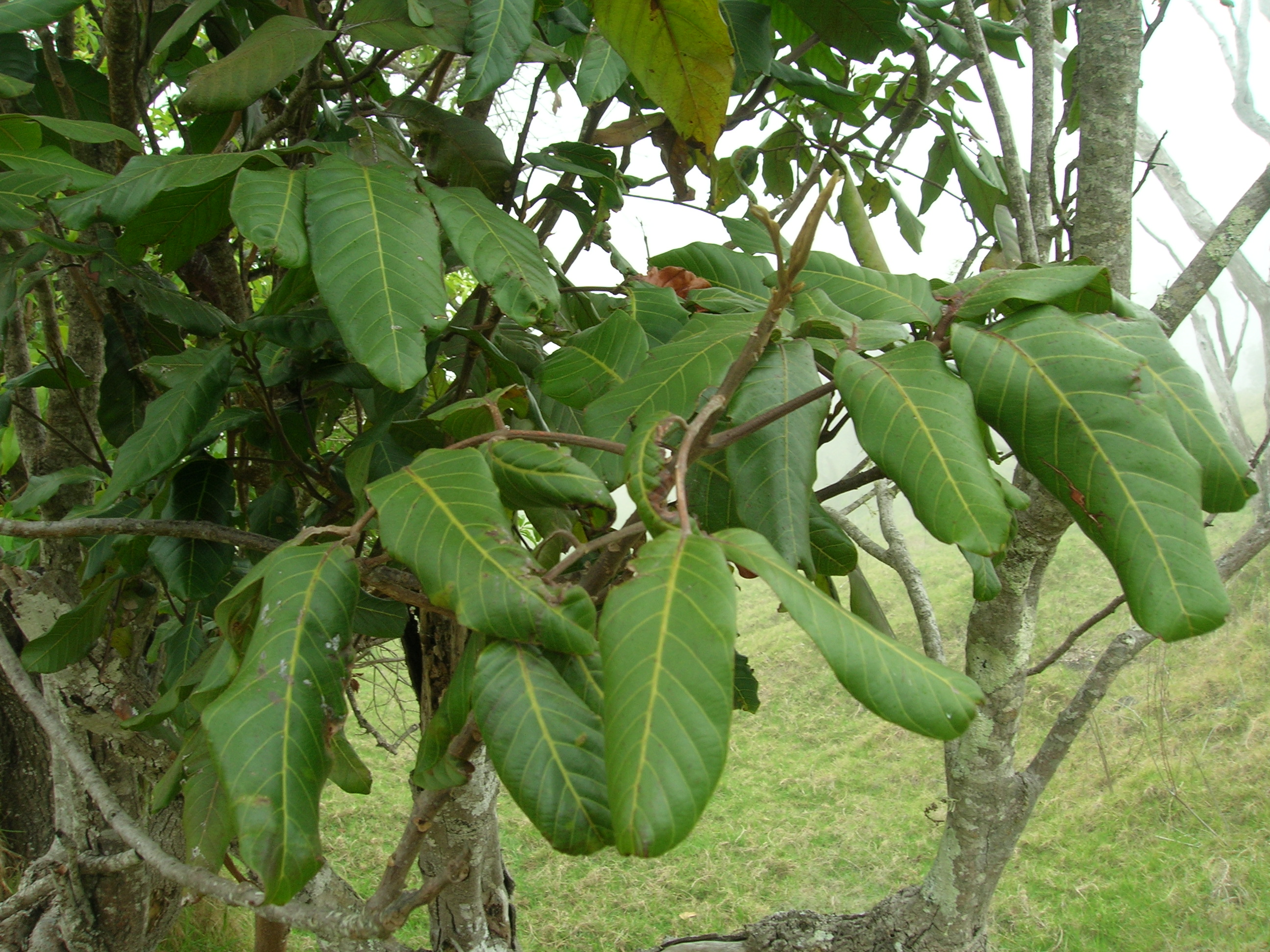
- A. m. var. auwahiensis

Conservation status
- Critically Endangered (IUCN 3.1)

Scientific classification
- Kingdom: Plantae
- Clade: Embryophytes
- Clade: Tracheophytes
- Clade: Angiosperms
- Clade: Eudicots
- Clade: Rosids
- Order: Sapindales
- Family: Sapindaceae
- Genus: Alectryon
- Species: A. macrococcus

Binomial name
- Alectryon macrococcus Radlk.

= Alectryon macrococcus =

Species of tree

Alectryon macrococcus, known as ʻAlaʻalahua or Māhoe in Hawaiian, is a slow-growing flowering tree in the soapberry family, Sapindaceae, that is endemic to mesic forests on the islands of Kauaʻi, Oʻahu, Molokaʻi, and Maui in Hawaii.

== Taxonomy ==
Alectryon macrococcus was initially described by German botanist William Hillebrand in 1888 as the provisional novel genus Mahoe. This description was based on incomplete, non-flowering specimens he had collected from the southwestern slope of Kaʻala on Oʻahu and the pali of Kalaupapa on Molokaʻi around 1870.

The specimens collected by Hillebrand were later annotated by Bavarian botanist Ludwig Adolph Timotheus Radlkofer in 1889, who then went on to publish the new species Alectryon macrococcus in 1890. Radlkofer's description had no type specimen and was based solely on Hillebrand's collected materials and published description. Following the discovery in 1910 of additional individuals at Auwahi forest on Maui by Austrian-American botanist Joseph Rock, Radlkofer & Rock published a full Latin description for Alectryon macrococcus in 1911. The specific epithet, macrococcus, literally means "large berry" or "long berry", and likely refers to the distinctive, large aril and seed of the plant.

In 1949, American botanist Harold St. John and American mycologist Lafayette Frederick described Alectryon mahoe, which was based on Oʻahu specimens and separated from Alectryon macrococcus based on leaf shape, hairiness of leaf undersides, and flower structure. This taxon is now considered to be a synonym of Alectryon macrococcus.

In 1987, American botanist George Linney assessed all known material as being within a single species, Alectryon macrococcus, and established two varieties - Alectryon macrococcus var. macrococcus, which included the Oʻahu material previously split off as Alectryon mahoe, and Alectryon macrococcus var. auwahiensis. This new variety was described to reflect the presence of dense, rusty-brown hairs on the underside of mature leaf surfaces of plants found in the Auwahi forest, a trait which is not seen in mature leaves of A. macrococcus var. macrococcus. This treatment of the species as a singular species with two accepted varieties was adopted in American botanist Warren Lambert Wagner et al.'s Manual of the Flowering Plants of Hawaii (1990), and is the accepted treatment today. The IUCN Red List description notes the possibility of a third variety, which has not yet been described.

== Description ==
This tree grows to an average of 6–7.6 m (20–25 ft), with a trunk diameter of 15–20 cm (5.9–7.9 in), and can reach a maximum height of about 11 m (36 ft). Mature trees are typically multi-trunked. The bark is reddish-brown or brown, with a sinewy appearance and a somewhat rough texture. The wood of Alectryon macrococcus is hard, dark yellowish-brown, and very tough.

It has compound leaves about 3–30 cm (1.2–11.8 in) in length, each being made up of two to five pairs of oval-shaped, net-veined leaflets which grow 10–25 cm (3.9–9.8 in) long and 5–12 cm (2.0–4.7 in) wide. The upper surface of these leaflets is smooth and glossy. Branchlets, flowers, and the emerging and young leaves of both varieties have a dense covering of silky-brown hairs. In mature leaves of A. macrococcus var. auwahiensis, the underside of leaflets has a dense covering of rust-colored hairs, while mature leaves of A. macrococcus var. macrococcus have either very sparse or no hairs on the undersides.

Flowers are borne on branched clusters up to 30 cm long, and are either perfect, with both male and female reproductive parts, or male. Trees in cultivation have been reported to flower for the first time at around 15 years of age, at which point they were 6 m (20 ft) tall with singular, 14 cm (5.5 in) diameter trunks. A high percentage of trees have been observed to flower but never bear fruit, despite being in apparent good health; it is possible that some trees may only bear functionally male flowers.

The fruits of Alectryon macrococcus, which are the largest in genus Alectryon, are from 2.5–7 cm (0.98–2.76 in) in diameter, bearing a hard rind with a smooth texture and a pale tan or brown color. Trees may produce up to 100 fruits annually. When mature, the rind cracks open and exposes the bright red, fleshy aril. Embedded within the aril is a single rounded, flattish seed, with a glossy surface and a chestnut-brown or black color.

== Distribution ==
Alectryon macrococcus inhabits mesic forests at elevations of 365–1,035 m (1,200–3,400 ft) on Kauaʻi, Oʻahu, Molokaʻi and western Maui. Historically, A. macrococcus var. macrococcus was widespread on the leeward sides of the Hawaiian Islands, but its population has been severely reduced. On Kauaʻi, it was reported near Makaweli in initial surveys, and can be found from Olokele Canyon to Kalalau Valley. It is reportedly uncommon on Oʻahu, where it is known from both the leeward and windward sides of the Waianae Range, the Mākaha Valley, and from two historical records in the Koʻolau Range. Soon after being documented on Molokaʻi in 1913, it was considered to be practically extinct there, and is extirpated from the type locality; today it has only been reported from the western region of East Molokaʻi, and only ten plants are thought to remain. On Maui, it is found in valleys and gulches on the eastern, western, and southern slopes of the West Maui Mountains, although less than twenty plants were recorded on Maui between 1973 and 2003.

Alectryon macrococcus var. auwahiensis is found only on the leeward side of east Maui, in the Hawaiian tropical dry forests of Haleakalā's southern slopes at elevations between 360–1,070 m (1,180–3,510 ft). It grows in, and has been historically recorded from, the Auwahi forest and near Pahihi Gulch. Rock discovered a population of around 40 trees in 1910 in the Auwahi forest, which has since declined. The second known population, which was found on a ridge east of Pahihi Gulch, is now extirpated.

== Habitat and ecology ==
Alectryon macrococcus is a slow-growing, relatively long-lived tree which grows in various dry to mesic lowland forest types, where it inhabits various north-facing gulch bottoms or lower gulch slopes. It is adapted to periodic droughts. It grows alongside hame (Antidesma platyphyllum), ʻahakea (Bobea sandwicensis), olopua (Notelaea sandwicensis), hōʻawa (Pittosporum confertiflorum, Pittosporum glabrum), ʻālaʻa (Planchonella sandwicensis), and maua (Xylosma spp.).

A. macrococcus var. auwahiensis is found on slopes and gulches of mesic to wetter mesic and upper dryland lowland ohia lehua (Metrosideros polymorpha) and lama (Diospyros sandwicensis) forest. It grows alongside akoko (Chamaesyce spp.), olopua (Nestegis sandwicensis), alani (Melicope hawaiiensis), kōlea lau nui (Myrsine lessertiana), ʻiliahi (Santalum spp.), and kōpiko (Psychotria spp.).

Little is known about the life history and ecology of Alectryon macrococcus. The flowering period of the plant is unknown, although it has been observed flowering as late as November. It is likely pollinated by insects. It has also been suggested that seeds for Alectryon macrococcus var. macrococcus may have been historically dispersed by the large, flightless ducks extant prior to the arrival of humans to the Hawaiian Islands. The fruits and seeds are eaten by invasive rodents, such as house mice (Mus musculus) and black rats (Rattus rattus), which negatively impacts natural regeneration.

Many trees have been observed with moderate to heavy growth of fruticose lichens on the branches, particularly Usnea australis and Teleoschistes sp., which may negatively impact growth. Reportedly, removal of lichens from one tree in Auwahi resulted in increased vigor and the tree producing more fruit the following year, suggesting that heavy lichen growth may reduce the photosynthetic capacity of already-weakened older trees and lead to earlier decline and death.

The black twig borer (Xylosandrus compactus) frequently infests Alectryon macrococcus, destroying new growth and potentially leading to the death of the tree. Prays fulvocanella, an endemic species of microlepidopteran, possibly predates the seeds of Alectryon macrococcus. The koa seedworm (Cryptophlebia illepida) has been reared from Alectryon macrococcus seeds and may represent another source of seed predation.

== Uses ==
Rock reported that Native Hawaiians ate the fleshy, light-tasting fruits and mildly flavored seeds, although the wood was not known to be widely used. The Hawaiian name of Alectryon macrococcus, māhoe, meant "twins", and likely referred to the fruits of the tree, which often form in pairs.

== Status ==
The entire species is federally listed as Endangered under the U.S. Endangered Species Act and as Critically Endangered on the IUCN Red List. The population of Alectryon macrococcus has declined from about 500 plants in 1997 to less than 300, of which no more than 250 are mature individuals. This population decline continues today, with habitat loss or degradation and competition with or predation by invasive species being major contributors. Existing individuals are in scattered subpopulations of limited size, and the species is likely to suffer from a limited gene pool, which may lead to reduced adaptability and vigor.

Soil erosion and habitat degradation caused by grazing and trampling from introduced ungulates (cattle, goats, and pigs) has been a significant historical concern and still poses a threat today. Some subpopulations, and all known remaining individuals of A. macrococcus var. auwahiensis, are now protected from damage by invasive ungulates by small woven-wire fence enclosures.

Subpopulations in or near military training areas on Oʻahu, Kauaʻi, and Maui additionally face the potential threat of accidental fires as a result of military activities. In July 1989, an unintentional 120 ha (300 acres) fire resulting from ordinance training activities came within 0.3 km (0.19 mi) of a subpopulation near the Makua Military Reservation before being contained. This fire also threatened seven other populations in the region. A single natural or human-caused disaster or disturbance could be catastrophic and, due to the extremely restricted numbers and range of the species, result in the extirpation of the species from an entire region.

The black twig borer, discovered to be present in Oʻahu in 1961 and now widespread across the Hawaiian Islands, represents possibly the most serious threat to the survival of Alectryon macrococcus. Most subpopulations across both variations of the species sustain some degree of damage from infestation by the black twig borer, which causes defoliation, reduces overall vigor and growth, and often leads to the death of infested twigs. Chronic infestation causes weakness and eventual premature death of the tree. Herbivory by black twig borers also limits wild reproduction and natural regeneration, as infestation and damage will often kill seedlings before they can reach sapling size. Natural regeneration is also further inhibited by seed predation from introduced rodents.

There are currently fewer than 130 known wild individuals of A. macrococcus var. macrococcus across around 27 sites. The population on Kauaʻi is less than 100, all of which are on state-owned land in Waimea Canyon and Nā Pali Coast State Park, with the largest known subpopulation being 49 mature individuals. It has been extirpated from the Koʻolau Range of Oʻahu, but individuals remain in scattered sites throughout the Wainae Mountains. Six remaining individuals across five sites were known on Molokaʻi as of 1997, all of which occurred within a 7.5 km^{2} (2.9 sq mi) area threatened by feral goats. Known populations on West Maui have declined, with most sites on privately-owned land.

The population of A. macrococcus var. auwahiensis has declined from two separate, relatively large populations, with at least 40 trees in the Auwahi population at the initial time of description by Rock in 1910, to the single Auwahi population which numbered 22 individuals in 1992. Today, this remaining population consists of only 12 mature individuals across a range of less than 10 km^{2} (3.9 sq mi) within a site of only 29 hectares (72 acres). This site is on both private and state-owned, privately-leased, ranchland. It has historically been severely degraded by cattle grazing and there are significant populations of invasive alien plant species including molasses grass (Melinis minutiflora), kikuyu grass (Cenchrus clandestinum), Opuntia spp., and Brazilian peppertree (Schinus terebinthifolia).

The black twig borer is a major threat to A. macrococcus var. auwahiensis. All known remaining trees exhibit some degree of infestation, resulting in defoliation and inhibited growth. It is also impacted by competition with invasive plant species and habitat alteration or damage from invasive chital (Axis axis) and black-tailed deer (Odocoileus hemionus columbianus) as well as pigs, cattle, and goats. All individuals are now protected from grazing or browsing by invasive ungulate species by small woven-wire enclosures.

Both varieties have been successfully propagated, with A. macrococcus var. auwahiensis propagated by the Hawaii Division of Forestry and Wildlife at its Maui baseyard and the Waimea Arboretum and Botanical Garden, and A. macrococcus var. macrococcus propagated at the Honolulu Botanic Garden and Lyon Arboretum. Seeds have been stored from both varieties, and the National Tropical Botanical Garden has successfully germinated seeds.
