= Spheterista cassia =

Scientific classification
- Domain: Eukaryota
- Kingdom: Animalia
- Phylum: Arthropoda
- Class: Insecta
- Order: Lepidoptera
- Family: Tortricidae
- Genus: Spheterista
- Species: S. cassia

Binomial name
- Spheterista cassia (Swezey, 1912)

Synonyms
- Capua cassia Swezey, 1912

Species of moth

Spheterista cassia is a moth of the family Tortricidae. It was first described by Otto Swezey in 1912. It is endemic to the Hawaiian island of Oahu.

The larvae feed on Cassia gaudichaudii.
