= Spheterista reynoldsiana =

Scientific classification
- Domain: Eukaryota
- Kingdom: Animalia
- Phylum: Arthropoda
- Class: Insecta
- Order: Lepidoptera
- Family: Tortricidae
- Genus: Spheterista
- Species: S. reynoldsiana

Binomial name
- Spheterista reynoldsiana (Swezey, 1920)

Synonyms
- Capua reynoldsiana Swezey, 1920

Species of moth

Spheterista reynoldsiana is a moth of the family Tortricidae. It was first described by Otto Swezey in 1920. It is endemic to the Hawaiian island of Oahu.
