= Spheterista variabilis =

Scientific classification
- Kingdom: Animalia
- Phylum: Arthropoda
- Class: Insecta
- Order: Lepidoptera
- Family: Tortricidae
- Genus: Spheterista
- Species: S. variabilis

Binomial name
- Spheterista variabilis (Walsingham in Sharp, 1907)

Synonyms
- Capua variabilis Walsingham in Sharp, 1907

Species of moth

Spheterista variabilis is a moth of the family Tortricidae. It was first described by Lord Walsingham in 1907. It is endemic to the Hawaiian islands of Molokai and Maui.

The larvae probably feed on Cheirodendron species.
