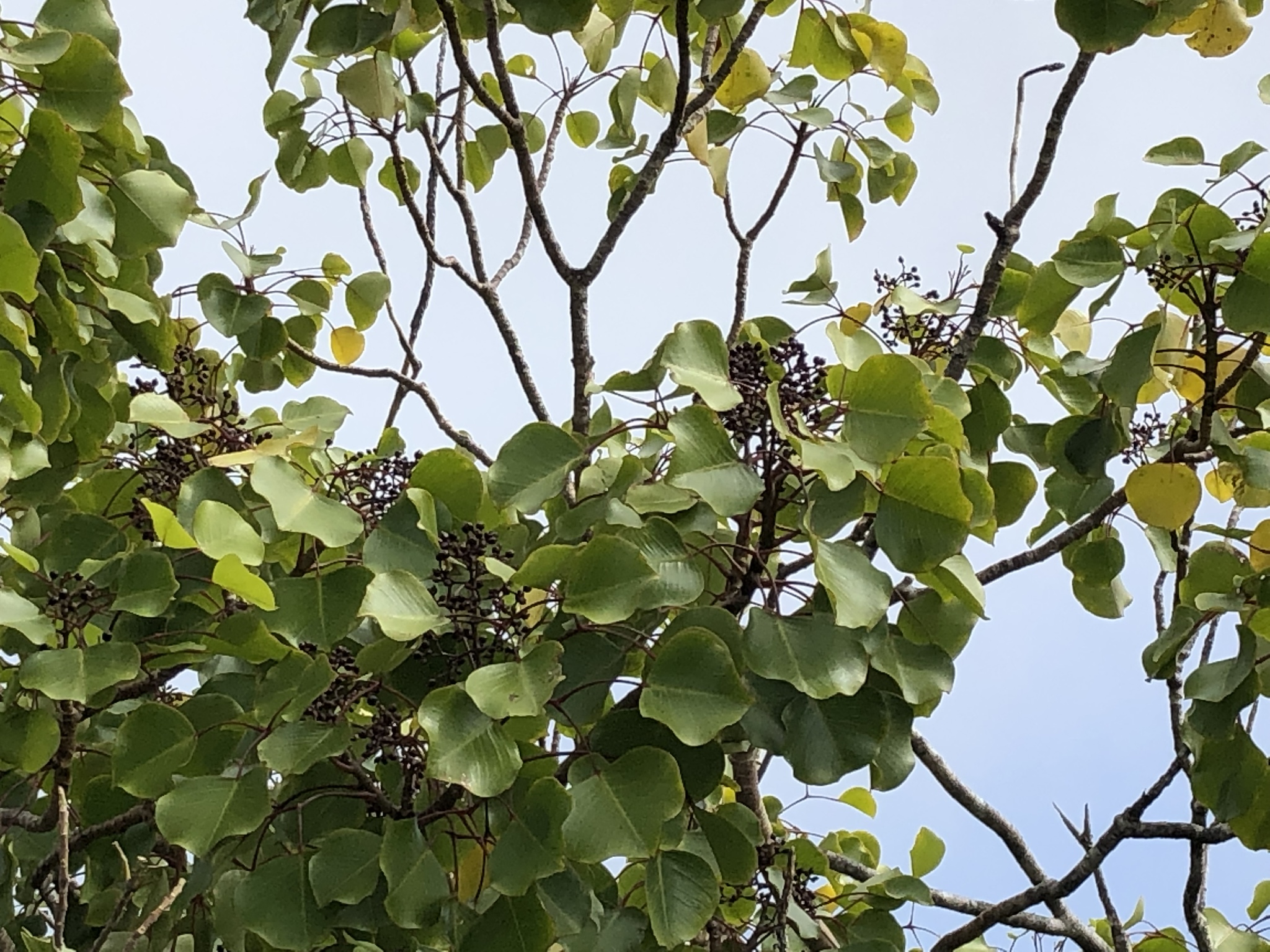

Scientific classification
- Kingdom: Plantae
- Clade: Tracheophytes
- Clade: Angiosperms
- Clade: Eudicots
- Clade: Asterids
- Order: Apiales
- Family: Araliaceae
- Genus: Cheirodendron
- Species: C. platyphyllum

Binomial name
- Cheirodendron platyphyllum (Hook. & Arn.) Seem.

Subspecies
- C. p. kauaiense (Krajina) Lowry; C. p. platyphyllum (Hook. & Arn.) Seem.

= Cheirodendron platyphyllum =

Species of plant

Cheirodendron platyphyllum, also known as lapalapa, is a species of flowering plant in the ginseng family, Araliaceae, that is endemic to the islands of Oʻahu and Kauaʻi in Hawaii. It is a small tree, reaching a height of 8 m (26 ft) and a trunk diameter of 20 cm (7.9 in). Lapalapa inhabits wet forests and bogs at elevations of 670–1,520 m (2,200–4,990 ft).
