= Pararrhaptica fuscocinereus =

Scientific classification
- Kingdom: Animalia
- Phylum: Arthropoda
- Class: Insecta
- Order: Lepidoptera
- Family: Tortricidae
- Genus: Pararrhaptica
- Species: P. fuscocinereus

Binomial name
- Pararrhaptica fuscocinereus (Swezey, 1913)

Synonyms
- Archips fuscocinereus Swezey, 1913; Archips fuscocinereous

Species of moth

Pararrhaptica fuscocinereus is a moth of the family Tortricidae. It was first described by Otto Swezey in 1913. It is endemic to the island of Hawaii.
