= P. lysimachiae =

P. lysimachiae may refer to:

- Papaipema lysimachiae, a moth of the family Noctuidae
- Pararrhaptica lysimachiae, a moth endemic to Kauai
- Phyllosticta lysimachiae, a sac fungus
