= Spheterista tetraplasandra =

Scientific classification
- Domain: Eukaryota
- Kingdom: Animalia
- Phylum: Arthropoda
- Class: Insecta
- Order: Lepidoptera
- Family: Tortricidae
- Genus: Spheterista
- Species: S. tetraplasandra

Binomial name
- Spheterista tetraplasandra (Swezey, 1920)

Synonyms
- Capua tetraplasandra Swezey, 1920

Species of moth

Spheterista tetraplasandra is a moth of the family Tortricidae. It was first described by Otto Swezey in 1920. It is endemic to the Hawaiian island of Oahu.

The larvae feed on Tetraplasandra species. The larvae have been found in the fruits and on the leaves of their host plant.
