= Pararrhaptica notocosma =

Scientific classification
- Kingdom: Animalia
- Phylum: Arthropoda
- Class: Insecta
- Order: Lepidoptera
- Family: Tortricidae
- Genus: Pararrhaptica
- Species: P. notocosma

Binomial name
- Pararrhaptica notocosma (Meyrick, 1928)

Synonyms
- Eulia notocosma Meyrick, 1928

Species of moth

Pararrhaptica notocosma is a moth of the family Tortricidae. It was first described by Edward Meyrick in 1928. It is endemic to the Hawaiian island of Oahu.

The larvae feed on Myrsine lessertiana.
