= Spheterista pterotropiana =

Scientific classification
- Domain: Eukaryota
- Kingdom: Animalia
- Phylum: Arthropoda
- Class: Insecta
- Order: Lepidoptera
- Family: Tortricidae
- Genus: Spheterista
- Species: S. pterotropiana

Binomial name
- Spheterista pterotropiana (Swezey, 1933)

Synonyms
- Capua pterotropiana Swezey, 1933

Species of moth

Spheterista pterotropiana is a moth of the family Tortricidae. It was first described by Otto Swezey in 1933. It is endemic to the Hawaiian island of Kauai.

The larvae feed on Tetraplasandra kauaiensis. They feed in the terminal buds of their host plant.
