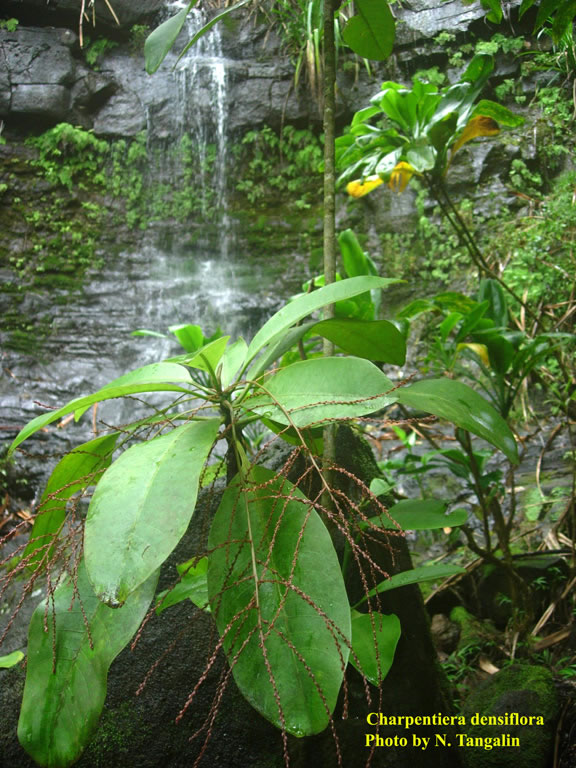

Conservation status
- Critically Imperiled (NatureServe)

Scientific classification
- Kingdom: Plantae
- Clade: Tracheophytes
- Clade: Angiosperms
- Clade: Eudicots
- Order: Caryophyllales
- Family: Amaranthaceae
- Genus: Charpentiera
- Species: C. densiflora

Binomial name
- Charpentiera densiflora Sohmer

= Charpentiera densiflora =

Species of flowering plant

Charpentiera densiflora is a rare species of tree in the family Amaranthaceae known by the common names dense-flowered pāpala and Nā Pali Coast pāpala. It is endemic to the island of Kauai in Hawaii, where there are 300 to 400 mature trees remaining. This and many other rare Kauaian plants were added to the endangered species list of the United States in 2010.

This is a tree growing up to 12 meters tall. It occurs in forests in moist mountain gulches which are dominated by hala (Pandanus tectorius), a common tree of the Pacific Islands. The leaves are roughly oval in shape and up to 40 centimeters long. The inflorescence is a branching panicle of flowers, each main branch bearing up to 100 flowers. Like other plants of its genus, this species is gynodioecious; most of the plants have bisexual flowers with male and female parts, but some have only female flowers. Some of the female parts in the bisexual flowers are abortive or nonfunctional, indicating that the species is in the middle of an evolution toward a fully dioecious system; eventually some flowers might start developing without the female parts. If the species becomes dioecious, some individuals will produce all male flowers and some will bear all female. This species has smaller seeds than any other of its genus.

The tree is found only on Kauai, and mainly on the Nā Pali Coast. There are seven populations. Many of the remaining individuals are in the forests of Hoolulu Valley at around 800 feet in elevation. The tree sometimes grows alongside Charpentiera elliptica, and the two species sometimes hybridize. However, the rare dense-flowered pāpala does not seem to be succumbing to the problems involved in hybridization, such as genetic pollution, as evidenced by its maintaining its numbers without having its population overcome by hybrids. It is possible that ecological isolation helps protect the tree.

This rare tree is threatened by a number of processes. It was probably much more widespread than it is today. Its habitat has been destroyed and degraded by feral goats and pigs, washed out by floods, and invaded by a number of non-native plant species. It experienced damage during Hurricane Iniki in 1992, which led to erosion.
