= Spheterista oheoheana =

Scientific classification
- Domain: Eukaryota
- Kingdom: Animalia
- Phylum: Arthropoda
- Class: Insecta
- Order: Lepidoptera
- Family: Tortricidae
- Genus: Spheterista
- Species: S. oheoheana

Binomial name
- Spheterista oheoheana (Swezey, 1933)

Synonyms
- Capua oheoheana Swezey, 1933

Species of moth

Spheterista oheoheana is a moth of the family Tortricidae. It was first described by Otto Swezey in 1933. It is endemic to the Hawaiian island of Kauai.

The larvae feed on Jetraplasandra kauaiensis. The larvae and pupae of the type series were collected from dead twigs.
