= Pararrhaptica lysimachiana =

Scientific classification
- Kingdom: Animalia
- Phylum: Arthropoda
- Class: Insecta
- Order: Lepidoptera
- Family: Tortricidae
- Genus: Pararrhaptica
- Species: P. lysimachiana

Binomial name
- Pararrhaptica lysimachiana (Swezey, 1946)

Synonyms
- Tortrix lysimachiana Swezey, 1946

Species of moth

Pararrhaptica lysimachiana is a moth of the family Tortricidae. It was first described by Otto Swezey in 1946. It is endemic to the Hawaiian island of Oahu.

The larvae feed on Lysimachia rotundifolia. The larvae have been found on the leaves of the host plant.
