= Mahoe =

Mahoe is a common name for several plants and may refer to:

- Alectryon macrococcus, or ʻalaʻalahua, a species of tree in the soapberry family endemic to Hawaii
- Hibiscus elatus, synonym Talipariti elatum, or blue mahoe, a species of tree in the mallow family native to the Caribbean
- Melicytus ramiflorus, a tree endemic to New Zealand
- Other Melicytus trees in New Zealand
