= Pararrhaptica sublichenoides =

Scientific classification
- Kingdom: Animalia
- Phylum: Arthropoda
- Class: Insecta
- Order: Lepidoptera
- Family: Tortricidae
- Genus: Pararrhaptica
- Species: P. sublichenoides

Binomial name
- Pararrhaptica sublichenoides (Swezey, 1913)

Synonyms
- Archips sublichenoides Swezey, 1913

Species of moth

Pararrhaptica sublichenoides is a moth of the family Tortricidae. It was first described by Otto Swezey in 1913. It is endemic to the island of Hawaii.
