= Spheterista urerana =

Scientific classification
- Domain: Eukaryota
- Kingdom: Animalia
- Phylum: Arthropoda
- Class: Insecta
- Order: Lepidoptera
- Family: Tortricidae
- Genus: Spheterista
- Species: S. urerana

Binomial name
- Spheterista urerana (Swezey, 1915)

Synonyms
- Epagoge urerana Swezey, 1915

Species of moth

Spheterista urerana is a moth of the family Tortricidae. It was first described by Otto Swezey in 1915. It is endemic to the Hawaiian island of Oahu.

The larvae feed on Urera sandvicensis.
