= Perrottetia alpestris subsp. philippinensis =

Scientific classification
- Kingdom: Plantae
- Clade: Tracheophytes
- Clade: Angiosperms
- Clade: Eudicots
- Clade: Rosids
- Order: Huerteales
- Family: Dipentodontaceae
- Genus: Perrottetia
- Species: P. alpestris
- Subspecies: P. a. subsp. philippinensis

Trinomial name
- Perrottetia alpestris subsp. philippinensis (S.Vidal) Ding Hou

Synonyms
- Caryospermum philippinense S.Vidal; Perrottetia alpestris var. philippinensis (S.Vidal) Loes.; Perrottetia philippinensis (S.Vidal) Loes.

Subspecies of flowering plant

Perrottetia alpestris subsp. philippinensis is a subspecies of Perrottetia alpestris. It is a plant in the family Dipentodontaceae, sometimes classified in the family Celastraceae.

== Description ==
Perrottetia alpestris subsp. philippinensis grows as a shrub or small tree measuring up to 12 metres (40 ft) tall. The twigs are purplish when fresh, drying black. The flowers are white or light greenish. The roundish fruits are red and measure up to 0.35 cm (0.1 in) in diameter.

== Distribution and habitat ==
Perrottetia alpestris subsp. philippinensis grows naturally in Borneo, the Philippines and Sulawesi. Its habitat is hill and montane forests to 2,700 metres (9,000 ft) altitude.
