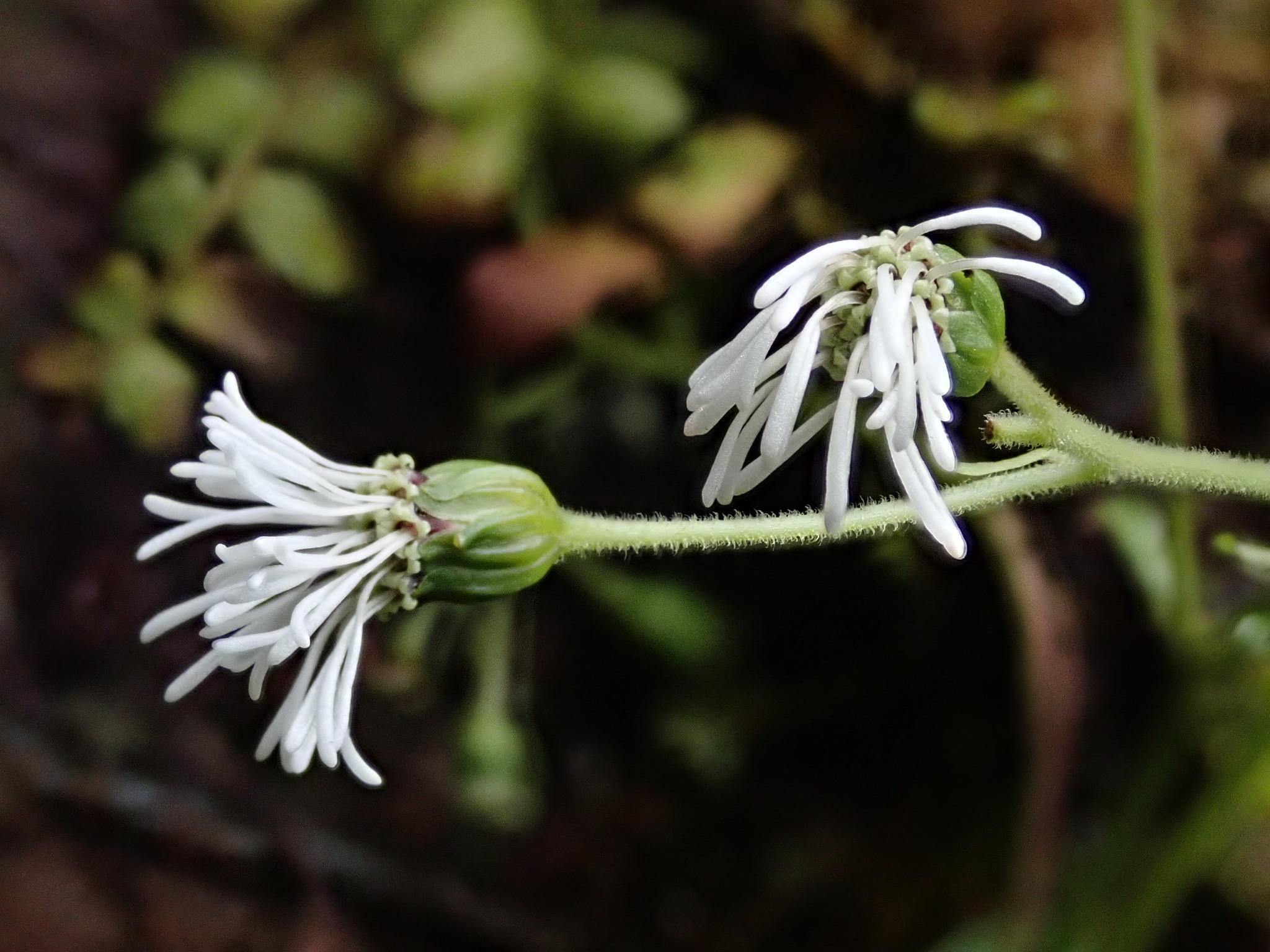

Conservation status
- Vulnerable (IUCN 3.1)

Scientific classification
- Kingdom: Plantae
- Clade: Tracheophytes
- Clade: Angiosperms
- Clade: Eudicots
- Clade: Asterids
- Order: Asterales
- Family: Asteraceae
- Genus: Adenostemma
- Species: A. harlingii

Binomial name
- Adenostemma harlingii R.M.King & H.Rob.

= Adenostemma harlingii =

Species of flowering plant

Adenostemma harlingii is a species of flowering plant in the family Asteraceae. It is endemic to Ecuador. Its natural habitat is subtropical or tropical moist montane forests. It is threatened by habitat loss.
