= Pararrhaptica punctiferana =

Scientific classification
- Kingdom: Animalia
- Phylum: Arthropoda
- Class: Insecta
- Order: Lepidoptera
- Family: Tortricidae
- Genus: Pararrhaptica
- Species: P. punctiferana

Binomial name
- Pararrhaptica punctiferana Walsingham in Sharp, 1907

Synonyms
- Pararrhaptica punctiferanus; Archips punctiferanus (Walsingham in Sharp, 1907); Tortrix punctiferana; Eulia punctiferana

Species of moth

Pararrhaptica punctiferana is a moth of the family Tortricidae. It was first described by Lord Walsingham in 1907. It is endemic to the Hawaiian islands of Molokai, Maui and Hawaii.
