= Cheirodendron bastardianum =

Conservation status
- Least Concern (IUCN 2.3)

Scientific classification
- Kingdom: Plantae
- Clade: Tracheophytes
- Clade: Angiosperms
- Clade: Eudicots
- Clade: Asterids
- Order: Apiales
- Family: Araliaceae
- Genus: Cheirodendron
- Species: C. bastardianum

Binomial name
- Cheirodendron bastardianum (Decne.) Frodin (1990)

Synonyms
- Aralia bastardiana Decne. (1855); Cheirodendron marquesense F.Br. (1935); Nothopanax bastardianus (Decne.) Harms (1894); Panax bastardianus (Decne.) Decne. (1864); Polyscias bastardianum (Decne.) S.L.Welsh (1998)

Species of flowering plant

Cheirodendron bastardianum is a species of flowering plant in the family Araliaceae. It is a tree endemic to the Marquesas Islands.

Cheirodendron bastardianum is a common canopy tree in low-canopied cloud forests above 1000 meters elevation, along with the trees Ilex anomala and Metrosideros collina and climbers of Freycinetia spp.
