= Pararrhaptica perkinsiana =

Scientific classification
- Kingdom: Animalia
- Phylum: Arthropoda
- Class: Insecta
- Order: Lepidoptera
- Family: Tortricidae
- Genus: Pararrhaptica
- Species: P. perkinsiana

Binomial name
- Pararrhaptica perkinsiana Walsingham, 1907

Synonyms
- Tortrix perkinsiana

Species of moth

Pararrhaptica perkinsiana is a moth of the family Tortricidae. It was first described by Lord Walsingham in 1907. It is endemic to the Hawaiian islands of Molokai and Maui. It is the type species of the genus Pararrhaptica.
