= Spheterista infaustana =

Scientific classification
- Domain: Eukaryota
- Kingdom: Animalia
- Phylum: Arthropoda
- Class: Insecta
- Order: Lepidoptera
- Family: Tortricidae
- Genus: Spheterista
- Species: S. infaustana

Binomial name
- Spheterista infaustana (Walsingham in Sharp, 1907)

Synonyms
- Epagoge infaustana Walsingham in Sharp, 1907; Capua infaustana

Species of moth

Spheterista infaustana is a moth of the family Tortricidae. It was first described by Lord Walsingham in 1907. It is endemic to the Hawaiian islands of Kauai, Oahu, Molokai, Maui and Hawaii.
