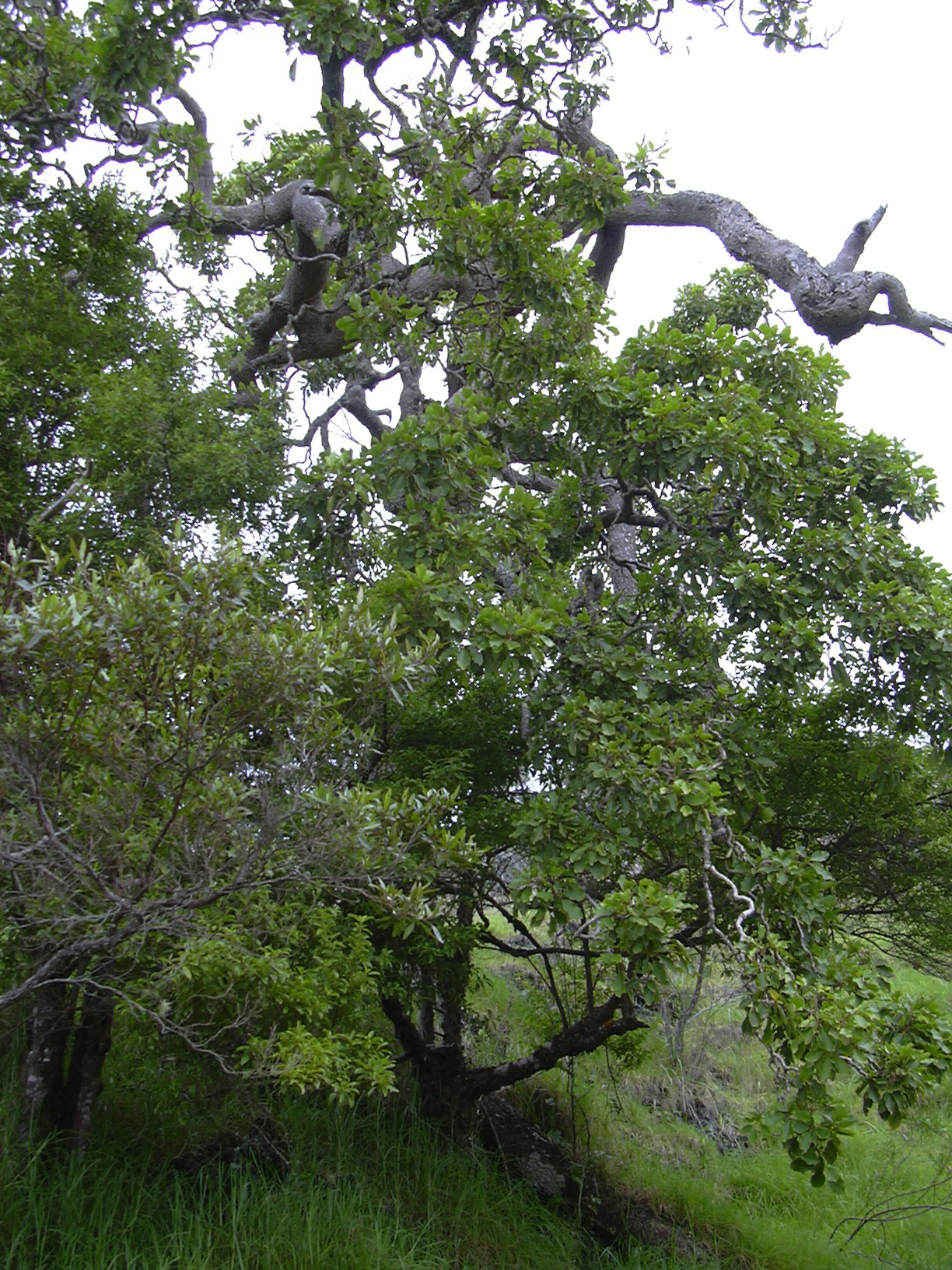
- Cheirodendron trigynum on Maui

Scientific classification
- Kingdom: Plantae
- Clade: Tracheophytes
- Clade: Angiosperms
- Clade: Eudicots
- Clade: Asterids
- Order: Apiales
- Family: Araliaceae
- Subfamily: Aralioideae
- Genus: Cheirodendron; Nutt. ex Seem.

Species
- Cheirodendron bastardianum; Cheirodendron dominii; Cheirodendron fauriei; Cheirodendron forbesii; Cheirodendron platyphyllum; Cheirodendron trigynum

= Cheirodendron =

Genus of flowering plants

Cheirodendron is a genus of flowering plant in the family Araliaceae. All six species in the genus are endemic to Polynesia. The five Hawaiian species are generally called ʻōlapa, and occur in wet forests on all major islands as well as some mesic forests, such as Kipuka Puaulu.

== Species ==
- Cheirodendron bastardianum (Decaisne) Frodin (Marquesas Islands) (= C. marquesense)
- Cheirodendron dominii Kraj. Kauaʻi
- Cheirodendron fauriei Hochr. (Kauaʻi)
- Cheirodendron forbesii (Sherff) Lowry (Kauaʻi)
- Cheirodendron platyphyllum (Hook. & Arn.) Seem. - Lapalapa (Oʻahu, Kauaʻi)
  - C. platyphyllum ssp. kauaiense
  - C. platyphyllum ssp. platyphyllum
- Cheirodendron trigynum (Gaudich.) A.Heller (main islands of Hawaiʻi)
  - C. trigynum ssp. helleri
  - C. trigynum ssp. trigynum
