= Spheterista xanthogona =

Scientific classification
- Domain: Eukaryota
- Kingdom: Animalia
- Phylum: Arthropoda
- Class: Insecta
- Order: Lepidoptera
- Family: Tortricidae
- Genus: Spheterista
- Species: S. xanthogona

Binomial name
- Spheterista xanthogona (Walsingham in Sharp, 1907)

Synonyms
- Epagoge xanthogona Walsingham in Sharp, 1907; Capua xanthogona

Species of moth

Spheterista xanthogona is a moth of the family Tortricidae. It was first described by Lord Walsingham in 1907. It is endemic to the island of Hawaii
