= Pararrhaptica trochilidana =

Scientific classification
- Kingdom: Animalia
- Phylum: Arthropoda
- Class: Insecta
- Order: Lepidoptera
- Family: Tortricidae
- Genus: Pararrhaptica
- Species: P. trochilidana

Binomial name
- Pararrhaptica trochilidana (Walsingham in Sharp, 1907)

Synonyms
- Archips trochilidanus Walsingham in Sharp, 1907; Eulia trochilidana

Species of moth

Pararrhaptica trochilidana is a moth of the family Tortricidae. It was first described by Lord Walsingham in 1907. It is endemic to the Hawaiian island of Molokai.
