= Spheterista =

Scientific classification
- Kingdom: Animalia
- Phylum: Arthropoda
- Class: Insecta
- Order: Lepidoptera
- Family: Tortricidae
- Tribe: Archipini
- Genus: Spheterista; Meyrick, 1912

Genus of tortrix moths

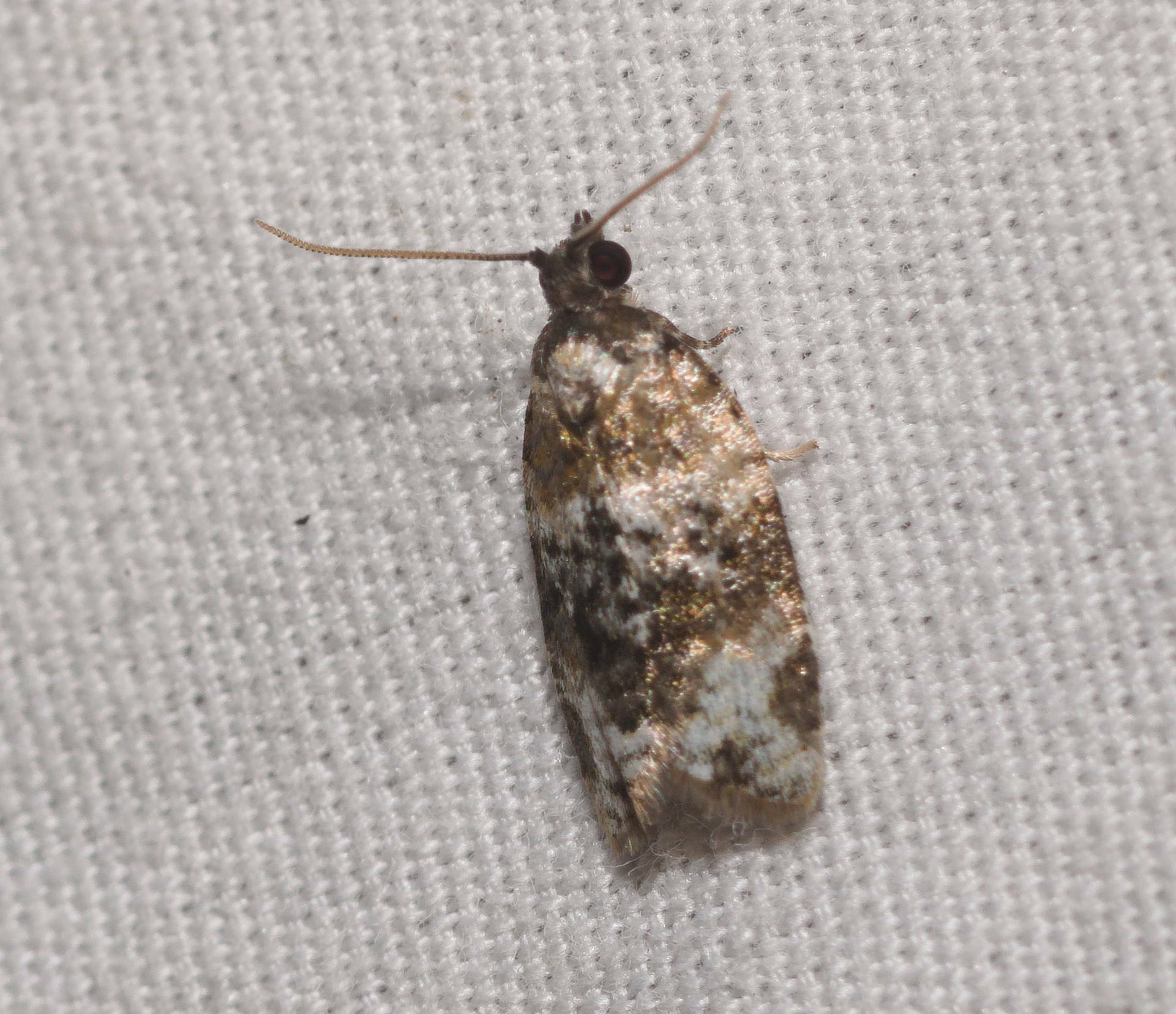

Spheterista is a genus of moths belonging to the subfamily Tortricinae of the family Tortricidae.

== Species ==
- Spheterista argentinotata (Walsingham, in Sharp, 1907)
- Spheterista cassia (Swezey, 1912)
- Spheterista flavocincta (Walsingham, in Sharp, 1907)
- Spheterista flavopicta (Walsingham, in Sharp, 1907)
- Spheterista fulva (Walsingham, in Sharp, 1907)
- Spheterista glaucoviridana (Walsingham, in Sharp, 1907)
- Spheterista hakeaiki Austin & Rubinoff, 2023
- Spheterista hiwakakahi Austin & Rubinoff, 2023
- Spheterista hoihoi Austin & Rubinoff, 2024
- Spheterista huakunana Austin & Rubinoff, 2023
- Spheterista infaustana (Walsingham, in Sharp, 1907)
- Spheterista ochreocuprea (Walsingham, in Sharp, 1907)
- Spheterista oheoheana (Swezey, 1933)
- Spheterista pernitida (Walsingham, in Sharp, 1907)
- Spheterista pleonectes (Walsingham, in Sharp, 1907)
- Spheterista pterotropiana (Swezey, 1933)
- Spheterista reynoldsiana (Swezey, 1920)
- Spheterista tetraplasandra (Swezey, 1920)
- Spheterista urerana (Swezey, 1915)
- Spheterista variabilis (Walsingham, in Sharp, 1907)
- Spheterista xanthogona (Walsingham, in Sharp, 1907)

== See also ==
- List of Tortricidae genera
