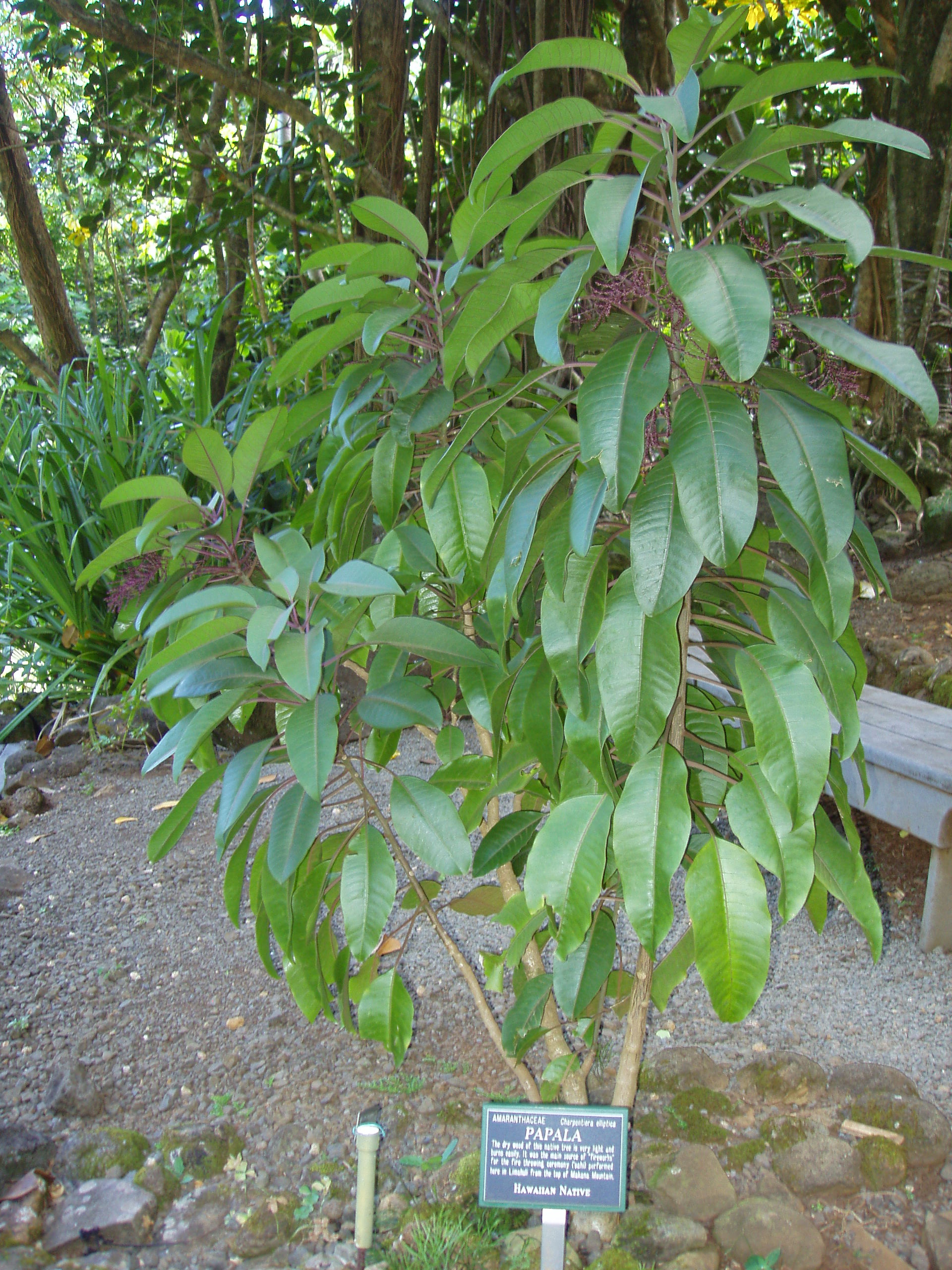
- Growing in Limahuli Garden and Preserve

Conservation status
- Endangered (IUCN 3.1)

Scientific classification
- Kingdom: Plantae
- Clade: Tracheophytes
- Clade: Angiosperms
- Clade: Eudicots
- Order: Caryophyllales
- Family: Amaranthaceae
- Genus: Charpentiera
- Species: C. elliptica

Binomial name
- Charpentiera elliptica (Hillebr.) A.Heller

= Charpentiera elliptica =

Species of tree

Charpentiera elliptica, the ellipticleaf pāpala, is an endangered species of flowering tree in the family Amaranthaceae, endemic to the island of Kauaʻi in Hawaiʻi. It inhabits coastal mesic and mixed mesic forests at elevations of 250–1,250 metres (820–4,100 ft). It is a perennial tree, growing up to 20 ft (6.1 m).
