= Pararrhaptica leucostichas =

Scientific classification
- Kingdom: Animalia
- Phylum: Arthropoda
- Class: Insecta
- Order: Lepidoptera
- Family: Tortricidae
- Genus: Pararrhaptica
- Species: P. leucostichas

Binomial name
- Pararrhaptica leucostichas (Meyrick, 1932)

Synonyms
- Eulia leucostichas Meyrick, 1932

Species of moth

Pararrhaptica leucostichas is a moth of the family Tortricidae. It was first described by Edward Meyrick in 1932. It is endemic to the Hawaiian island of Oahu.

The larvae feed on Myrsine species. They feed on the shoots of their host plant.
