= Charpentiera australis =

Conservation status
- Critically Endangered (IUCN 3.1)

Scientific classification
- Kingdom: Plantae
- Clade: Embryophytes
- Clade: Tracheophytes
- Clade: Angiosperms
- Clade: Eudicots
- Order: Caryophyllales
- Family: Amaranthaceae
- Genus: Charpentiera
- Species: C. australis

Binomial name
- Charpentiera australis Sohmer

Species of flowering plant

Charpentiera australis is a species of flowering plant in the family Amaranthaceae. It is a tree or shrub native to Rarotonga in the Cook Islands, and to Raivavae and Tubuai in the Tubuai Islands of French Polynesia.

It grows in lowland rain forests from 100 to 370 metres (330 to 1,210 ft) elevation. The range and population of the species is very limited. The species' population is estimated at 50 mature individuals on the three islands, with an area of occupancy (AOO) is 8 square kilometres (3.1 sq mi) on Raivavae. There are fewer than 10 subpopulations on the three islands, with only one known on Rarotonga. The population of the species is likely declining, and threats include habitat loss from forest clearance and fires, competition from invasive species, and predation from introduced pests.
