= Pararrhaptica fuscoviridis =

Scientific classification
- Kingdom: Animalia
- Phylum: Arthropoda
- Class: Insecta
- Order: Lepidoptera
- Family: Tortricidae
- Genus: Pararrhaptica
- Species: P. fuscoviridis

Binomial name
- Pararrhaptica fuscoviridis (Walsingham in Sharp, 1907)

Synonyms
- Archips fuscoviridis Walsingham in Sharp, 1907; Eulia fuscoviridis

Species of moth

Pararrhaptica fuscoviridis is a moth of the family Tortricidae. It was first described by Lord Walsingham in 1907. It is endemic to the Hawaiian island of Lanai.
