= Pararrhaptica lysimachiae =

Scientific classification
- Kingdom: Animalia
- Phylum: Arthropoda
- Class: Insecta
- Order: Lepidoptera
- Family: Tortricidae
- Genus: Pararrhaptica
- Species: P. lysimachiae

Binomial name
- Pararrhaptica lysimachiae (Swezey, 1933)

Synonyms
- Eulia lysimachiae Swezey, 1933

Species of moth

Pararrhaptica lysimachiae is a moth of the family Tortricidae. It was first described by Otto Swezey in 1933. It is endemic to the Hawaiian island of Kauai.

The larvae feed on Lysimachia glutinosa and Lysimachia hillebrandi. The larvae have been found on the leaves of their host plant.
