= Pararrhaptica leopardella =

Scientific classification
- Kingdom: Animalia
- Phylum: Arthropoda
- Class: Insecta
- Order: Lepidoptera
- Family: Tortricidae
- Genus: Pararrhaptica
- Species: P. leopardella

Binomial name
- Pararrhaptica leopardella (Walsingham in Sharp, 1907)

Synonyms
- Pararrhaptica leopardellus; Archips leopardellus Walsingham in Sharp, 1907; Tortrix leopardella; Eulia leopardellus

Species of moth

Pararrhaptica leopardella is a moth of the family Tortricidae. It was first described by Lord Walsingham in 1907. It is endemic to the Hawaiian island of Kauai.
