= Pararrhaptica capucina =

Scientific classification
- Kingdom: Animalia
- Phylum: Arthropoda
- Class: Insecta
- Order: Lepidoptera
- Family: Tortricidae
- Genus: Pararrhaptica
- Species: P. capucina

Binomial name
- Pararrhaptica capucina (Walsingham in Sharp, 1907)

Synonyms
- Tortrix capucina Walsingham in Sharp, 1907; Archips capucina; Eulia capucina

Species of moth

Pararrhaptica capucina is a moth of the family Tortricidae. It was first described by Lord Walsingham in 1907. It is endemic to the Hawaiian islands of Oahu, Molokai and Hawaii.
