= Perrottetia multiflora =

Conservation status
- Least Concern (IUCN 3.1)

Scientific classification
- Kingdom: Plantae
- Clade: Tracheophytes
- Clade: Angiosperms
- Clade: Eudicots
- Clade: Rosids
- Order: Huerteales
- Family: Dipentodontaceae
- Genus: Perrottetia
- Species: P. multiflora

Binomial name
- Perrottetia multiflora Lundell

Species of flowering plant

Perrottetia multiflora is a species of flowering plant in the plant family Dipentodontaceae. It is native to Colombia, Costa Rica, Ecuador, Panama, Peru, and Venezuela and is threatened by habitat loss.
