= Spheterista argentinotata =

Scientific classification
- Domain: Eukaryota
- Kingdom: Animalia
- Phylum: Arthropoda
- Class: Insecta
- Order: Lepidoptera
- Family: Tortricidae
- Genus: Spheterista
- Species: S. argentinotata

Binomial name
- Spheterista argentinotata (Clarke in Zimmerman, 1978)

Synonyms
- Epagoge argentinotata Walsingham, in Sharp, 1907; Capua argentinotata

Species of moth

Spheterista argentinotata is a moth of the family Tortricidae. It was first described by John Frederick Gates Clarke in 1978. It is endemic to the island of Hawaii.
