= Spheterista flavocincta =

Scientific classification
- Domain: Eukaryota
- Kingdom: Animalia
- Phylum: Arthropoda
- Class: Insecta
- Order: Lepidoptera
- Family: Tortricidae
- Genus: Spheterista
- Species: S. flavocincta

Binomial name
- Spheterista flavocincta (Walsingham in Sharp, 1907)

Synonyms
- Capua flavocincta Walsingham in Sharp, 1907; Capua santalata Swezey, 1913; Capua trigonifer Walsingham in Sharp, 1907

Species of moth

Spheterista flavocincta is a moth of the family Tortricidae. It was first described by Lord Walsingham in 1907. It is endemic to the Hawaiian islands of Oahu and Hawaii.
