= Pararrhaptica falerniana =

Scientific classification
- Kingdom: Animalia
- Phylum: Arthropoda
- Class: Insecta
- Order: Lepidoptera
- Family: Tortricidae
- Genus: Pararrhaptica
- Species: P. falerniana

Binomial name
- Pararrhaptica falerniana (Walsingham in Sharp, 1907)

Synonyms
- Tortrix falerniana Walsingham in Sharp, 1907; Eulia falerniana

Species of moth

Pararrhaptica falerniana is a moth of the family Tortricidae. It was first described by Lord Walsingham in 1907. It is endemic to the Hawaiian island of Molokai.
