= Spheterista flavopicta =

Scientific classification
- Domain: Eukaryota
- Kingdom: Animalia
- Phylum: Arthropoda
- Class: Insecta
- Order: Lepidoptera
- Family: Tortricidae
- Genus: Spheterista
- Species: S. flavopicta

Binomial name
- Spheterista flavopicta (Walsingham in Sharp, 1907)

Synonyms
- Capua flavopicta Walsingham in Sharp, 1907; Capua picta Walsingham in Sharp, 1907

Species of moth

Spheterista flavopicta is a moth of the family Tortricidae. It was first described by Lord Walsingham in 1907. It is endemic to the Hawaiian island of Kauai.

The larvae feed on Santalum species.
