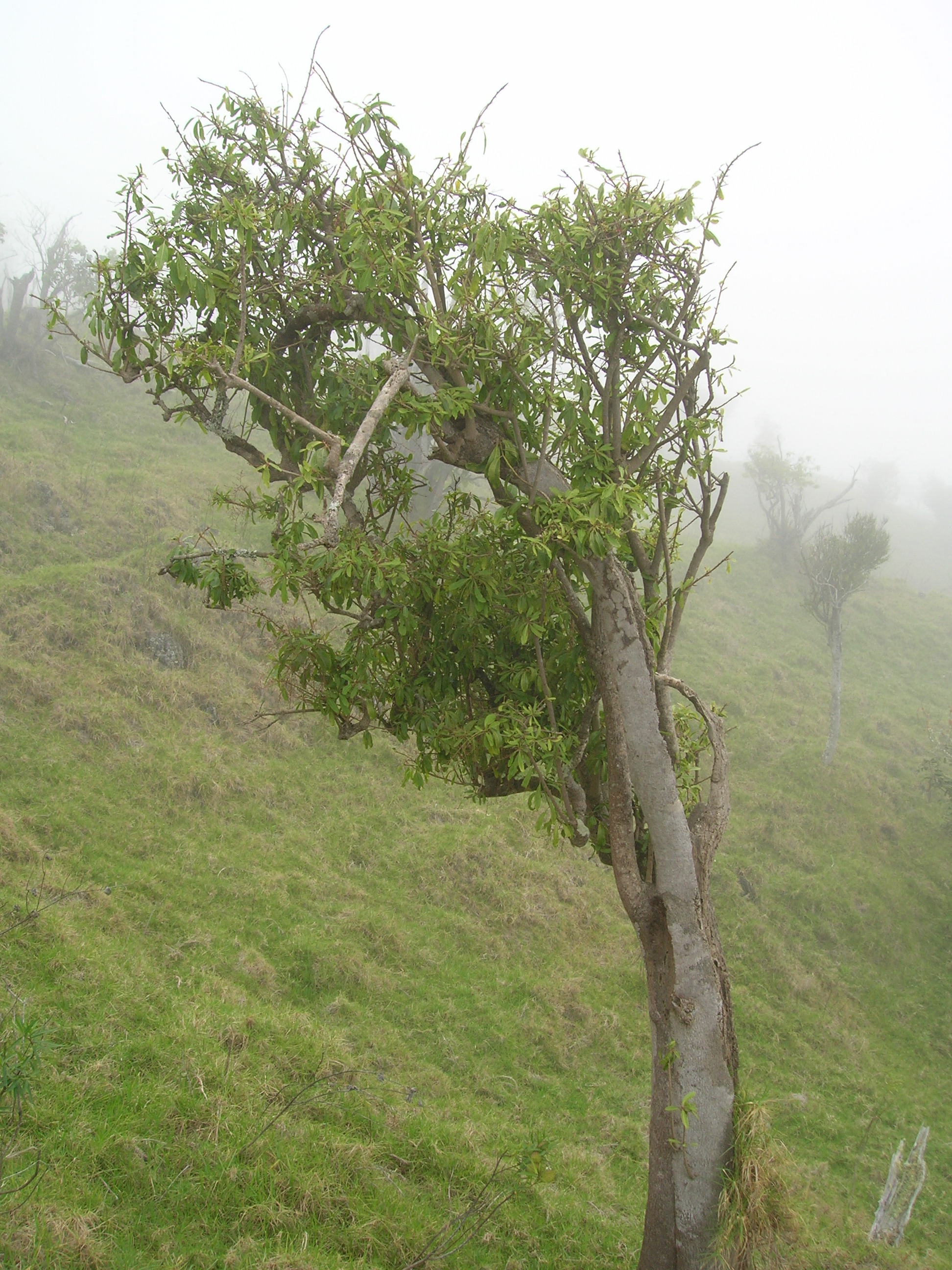
- Charpentiera obovata

Scientific classification
- Kingdom: Plantae
- Clade: Tracheophytes
- Clade: Angiosperms
- Clade: Eudicots
- Order: Caryophyllales
- Family: Amaranthaceae
- Subfamily: Amaranthoideae
- Genus: Charpentiera; Gaudich.

Species
- Charpentiera australis Charpentiera densiflora Charpentiera elliptica Charpentiera obovata Charpentiera ovata Charpentiera tomentosa

= Charpentiera =

Genus of trees

Charpentiera is a flowering plant genus in the family Amaranthaceae. It consists of five species endemic to Hawaiʻi, where they are known as pāpala, and one species found only on the island of Tubuai in the Austral Islands. All species are trees, some reaching more than 10 metres (33 ft) in height. The genus is named for Arsène Charpentier (1781-1818), professor of pharmacy at Antwerp from 1810 to 1814 and at Cherbourg from 1814 to 1816.

== Species ==
- Charpentiera australis Sohmer (Rarotonga in the Cook Islands and Tubuai and Raivavae in the Tubuai Islands)
- Charpentiera densiflora Sohmer (Kauaʻi)
- Charpentiera elliptica (Hillebr.) A.Heller (Kauaʻi)
- Charpentiera obovata Gaudich. (main islands of Hawaiʻi)
- Charpentiera ovata Gaudich. (Oʻahu, Molokaʻi, Maui, island of Hawaiʻi)
- Charpentiera tomentosa Sohmer
  - Charpentiera tomentosa var. maakuaensis (Oʻahu)
  - Charpentiera tomentosa var. tomentosa (Oʻahu, Molokaʻi, Lānaʻi, Maui, island of Hawaiʻi)

== Uses ==
Native Hawaiians on the northwest coast of the island of Kauaʻi used lightweight pāpala branches in the art of ʻōahi. Branches were ignited and tossed off of high sea cliffs, where they were buoyed by ridge lifts and burned like fireworks.
