= Pararrhaptica =

Scientific classification
- Kingdom: Animalia
- Phylum: Arthropoda
- Class: Insecta
- Order: Lepidoptera
- Family: Tortricidae
- Subfamily: Tortricinae
- Tribe: Archipini
- Genus: Pararrhaptica; Walsingham, 1907

Genus of tortrix moths

Pararrhaptica is a genus of moths belonging to the family Tortricidae.

== Species ==
- Pararrhaptica capucina (Walsingham, in Sharp, 1907)
- Pararrhaptica chlorippa (Meyrick, 1928)
- Pararrhaptica dermatopa (Meyrick, 1928)
- Pararrhaptica falerniana (Walsingham, in Sharp, 1907)
- Pararrhaptica fuscocinereus (Swezey, 1913)
- Pararrhaptica fuscoviridis (Walsingham, in Sharp, 1907)
- Pararrhaptica huihui Austin & Rubinoff, 2024
- Pararrhaptica kaiona Austin & Rubinoff, 2023
- Pararrhaptica leopardella (Walsingham, in Sharp, 1907)
- Pararrhaptica leucostichas (Meyrick, 1932)
- Pararrhaptica lichenoides (Walsingham, in Sharp, 1907)
- Pararrhaptica longiplicata (Walsingham, in Sharp, 1907)
- Pararrhaptica lysimachiae (Swezey, 1933)
- Pararrhaptica lysimachiana (Swezey, 1946)
- Pararrhaptica notocosma (Meyrick, 1928)
- Pararrhaptica perkinsiana Walsingham, in Sharp, 1907
- Pararrhaptica punctiferana (Walsingham, in Sharp, 1907)
- Pararrhaptica pycnomias (Meyrick, 1929)
- Pararrhaptica sublichenoides (Swezey, 1913)
- Pararrhaptica subsenescens (Walsingham, in Sharp, 1907)
- Pararrhaptica trochilidana (Walsingham, in Sharp, 1907)

== See also ==
- List of Tortricidae genera
