= Spheterista ochreocuprea =

Scientific classification
- Domain: Eukaryota
- Kingdom: Animalia
- Phylum: Arthropoda
- Class: Insecta
- Order: Lepidoptera
- Family: Tortricidae
- Genus: Spheterista
- Species: S. ochreocuprea

Binomial name
- Spheterista ochreocuprea (Walsingham in Sharp, 1907)

Synonyms
- Capua ochreocuprea Walsingham in Sharp, 1907

Species of moth

Spheterista ochreocuprea is a moth of the family Tortricidae. It was first described by Lord Walsingham in 1907. It is endemic to the Hawaiian island of Kauai.
