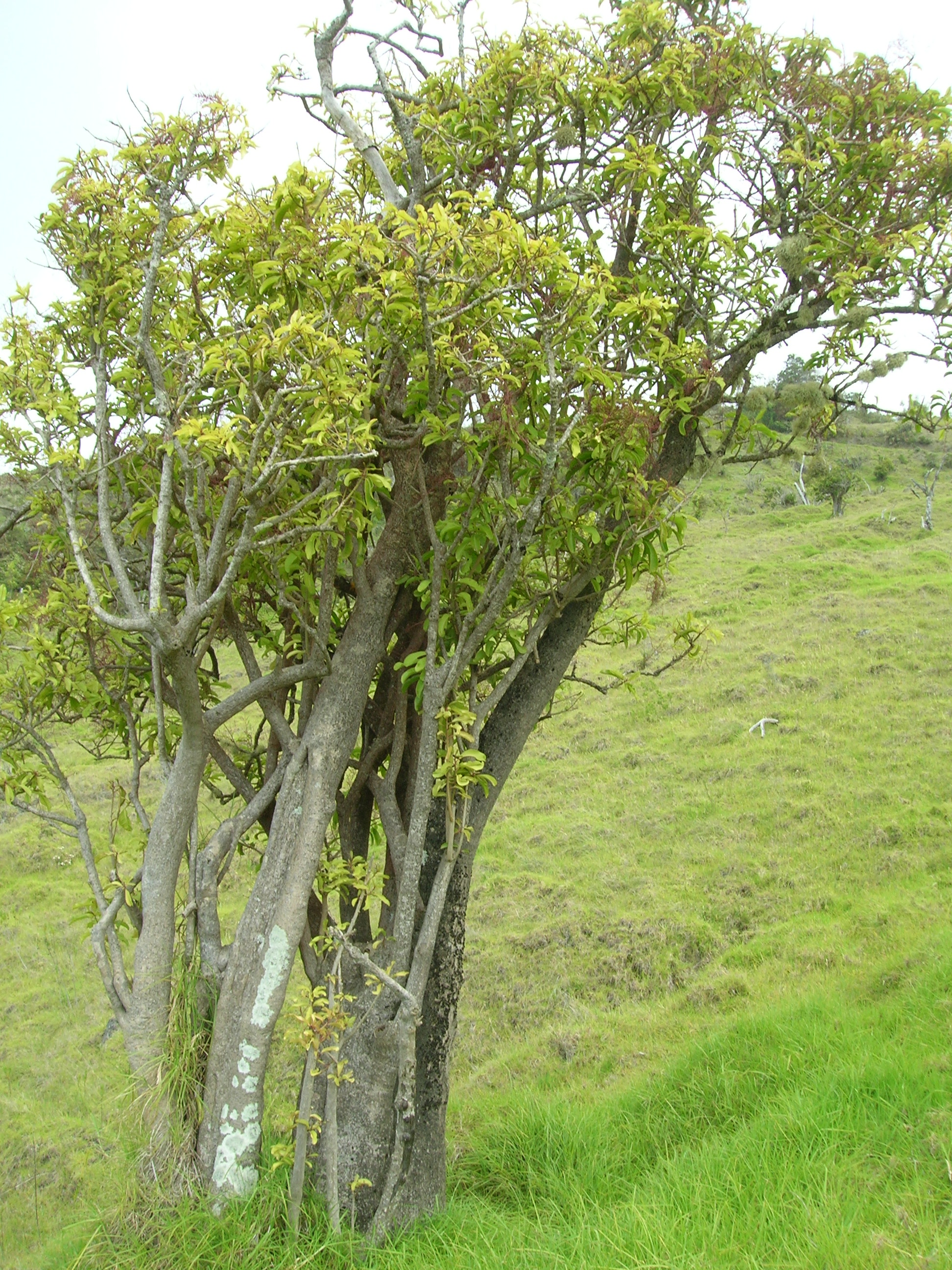

Conservation status
- Vulnerable (NatureServe)

Scientific classification
- Kingdom: Plantae
- Clade: Tracheophytes
- Clade: Angiosperms
- Clade: Eudicots
- Order: Caryophyllales
- Family: Amaranthaceae
- Genus: Charpentiera
- Species: C. obovata

Binomial name
- Charpentiera obovata Gaudich.

= Charpentiera obovata =

Species of tree

Charpentiera obovata, known as broadleaf pāpala, is a species of flowering shrub or small tree in the family Amaranthaceae, that is endemic to Hawaiʻi. It inhabits dry, coastal mesic, mixed mesic, and wet forests at elevations of 190–1,750 metres (620–5,740 ft) on all main islands. C. obovata reaches a height of 4.6–9.1 metres (15–30 ft) and a trunk diameter of 0.1–0.6 metres (0.33–1.97 ft).
