= Perrottetia excelsa =

Conservation status
- Data Deficient (IUCN 3.1)

Scientific classification
- Kingdom: Plantae
- Clade: Tracheophytes
- Clade: Angiosperms
- Clade: Eudicots
- Clade: Rosids
- Order: Huerteales
- Family: Dipentodontaceae
- Genus: Perrottetia
- Species: P. excelsa

Binomial name
- Perrottetia excelsa Lundell

Species of flowering plant

Perrottetia excelsa is a species of flowering plant in the plant family Dipentodontaceae. It is endemic to Panama.
