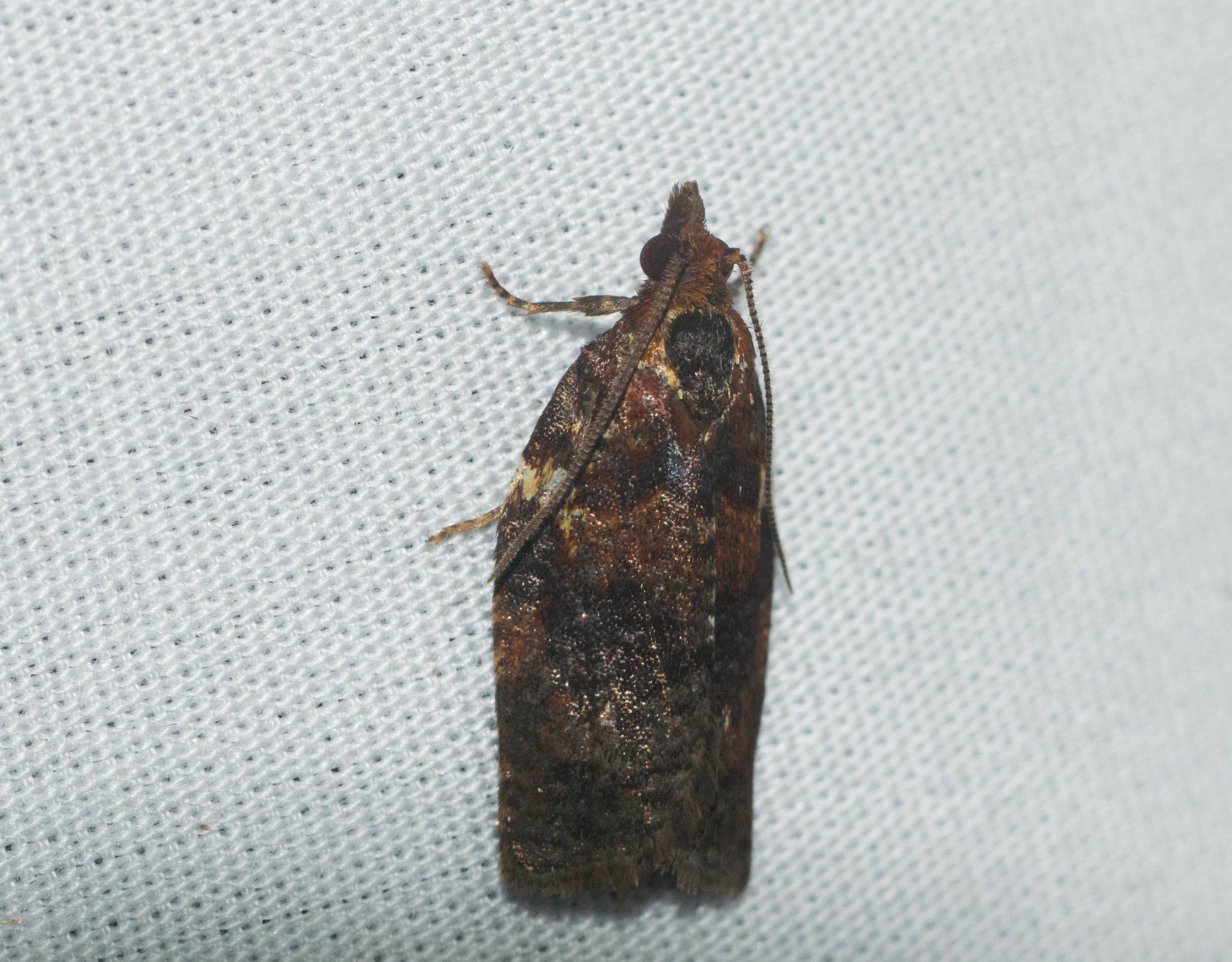

Scientific classification
- Domain: Eukaryota
- Kingdom: Animalia
- Phylum: Arthropoda
- Class: Insecta
- Order: Lepidoptera
- Family: Tortricidae
- Genus: Spheterista
- Species: S. pleonectes

Binomial name
- Spheterista pleonectes (Walsingham in Sharp, 1907)

Synonyms
- Capua pleonectes Walsingham in Sharp, 1907; Capua castaneana Walsingham in Sharp, 1907; Spheterista asaphopis Meyrick, 1928

= Spheterista pleonectes =

Species of moth

Spheterista pleonectes is a moth of the family Tortricidae. It was first described by Lord Walsingham in 1907. It is endemic to the Hawaiian islands of Kauai, Oahu and Hawaii.

The larvae feed on Cheirodendron gaudichaudii. They feed between webbed leaves of their host plant. The caterpillars are green.
