= Pararrhaptica longiplicata =

Scientific classification
- Kingdom: Animalia
- Phylum: Arthropoda
- Class: Insecta
- Order: Lepidoptera
- Family: Tortricidae
- Genus: Pararrhaptica
- Species: P. longiplicata

Binomial name
- Pararrhaptica longiplicata (Walsingham in Sharp, 1907)

Synonyms
- Pararrhaptica longiplicatus; Archips longiplicatus Walsingham in Sharp, 1907; Tortrix longiplicata; Eulia longiplicata

Species of moth

Pararrhaptica longiplicata is a moth of the family Tortricidae. It was first described by Lord Walsingham in 1907. It is endemic to the Hawaiian islands of Kauai, Oahu, Maui, Lanai and Hawaii.

The larvae feed on Myrsine species.
