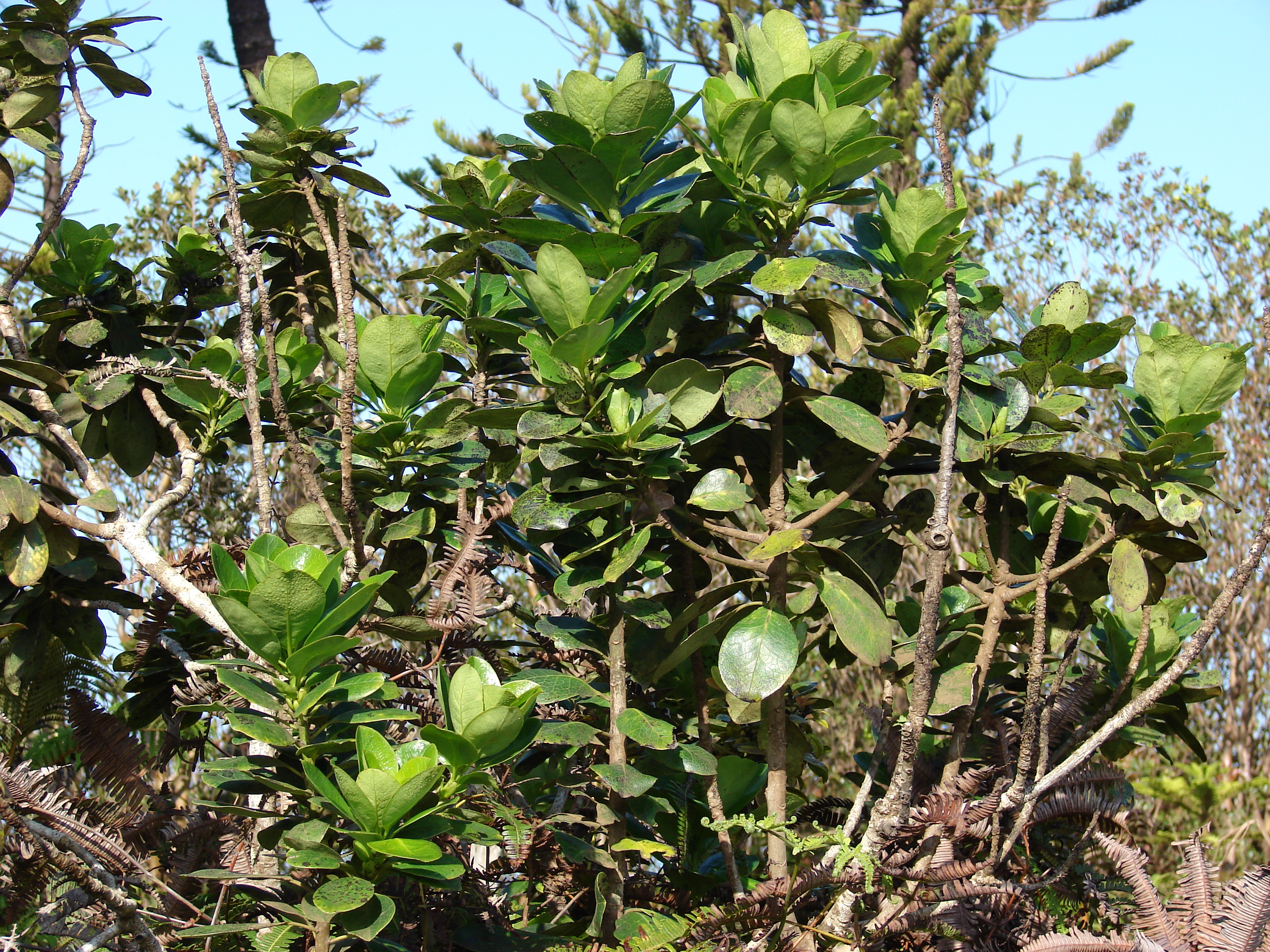

Conservation status
- Least Concern (IUCN 3.1)

Scientific classification
- Kingdom: Plantae
- Clade: Embryophytes
- Clade: Tracheophytes
- Clade: Angiosperms
- Clade: Eudicots
- Clade: Asterids
- Order: Aquifoliales
- Family: Aquifoliaceae
- Genus: Ilex
- Species: I. anomala

Binomial name
- Ilex anomala Hook. & Arn.

Synonyms
- Byronia anomala (Hook. & Arn.) A.Heller; Byronia helleri H.Lév.; Byronia hookeri Steud.; Byronia sandwicensis Endl.; Byronia taitensis A.Gray; Ilex hawaiensis S.Y.Hu; Ilex marquesensis F.Br.; Ilex sandwicensis Loes.; Ilex taitensis (A.Gray) J.W.Moore; Polystigma hookeri Meisn.

= Ilex anomala =

Kāwaʻu

Species of flowering plant

Ilex anomala, commonly known as Hawai'i holly, kāwaʻu, or ʻaiea in Hawaii, is a species of holly. It is native to the Hawaiian Islands and the Marquesas Islands and Society Islands of French Polynesia.

On Hawaii it inhabits mixed mesic and wet forests at elevations of 600–1,400 m (2,000–4,600 ft) on all main islands. In the Marquesas Islands it is a characteristic canopy tree in low-canopied cloud forests above 1000 meters elevation, along with the trees Cheirodendron bastardianum and Metrosideros collina and climbers of Freycinetia spp.
