= Zanthoxylum dipetalum =

Conservation status
- Vulnerable (IUCN 3.1)

- Imperiled (NatureServe)

Scientific classification
- Kingdom: Plantae
- Clade: Tracheophytes
- Clade: Angiosperms
- Clade: Eudicots
- Clade: Rosids
- Order: Sapindales
- Family: Rutaceae
- Genus: Zanthoxylum
- Species: Z. dipetalum

Binomial name
- Zanthoxylum dipetalum H.Mann

Synonyms
- Homotypic Synonyms: Fagara dipetala (H.Mann) Engl.

Species of tree

Zanthoxylum dipetalum is a species of rare tree in the family Rutaceae and in the same genus as Sichuan pepper. It is known by the Hawaiian names kāwa'u and aʻe. It is endemic to the Hawaiian archipelago, where it grows in forests on four of the islands.

There are two varieties.

- Z. d. var. dipetalum is present on Kauaʻi, in the mountains of Oʻahu, on Hawaiʻi in Hawaiʻi Volcanoes National Park, and possibly on Molokaʻi.
- Z. d. var. tomentosum is known from fewer than 30 individuals on Hualālai volcano on Hawaiʻi. This variety is a federally listed endangered species of the United States.

The roots of Z. dipetalum have been found to contain several chemical compounds, including canthin-6-one, chelerythrine, nitidine, tembetarine, avicennol, xanthoxyletin, lupeol, hesperidin, sitosterol, and magnoflorine.
