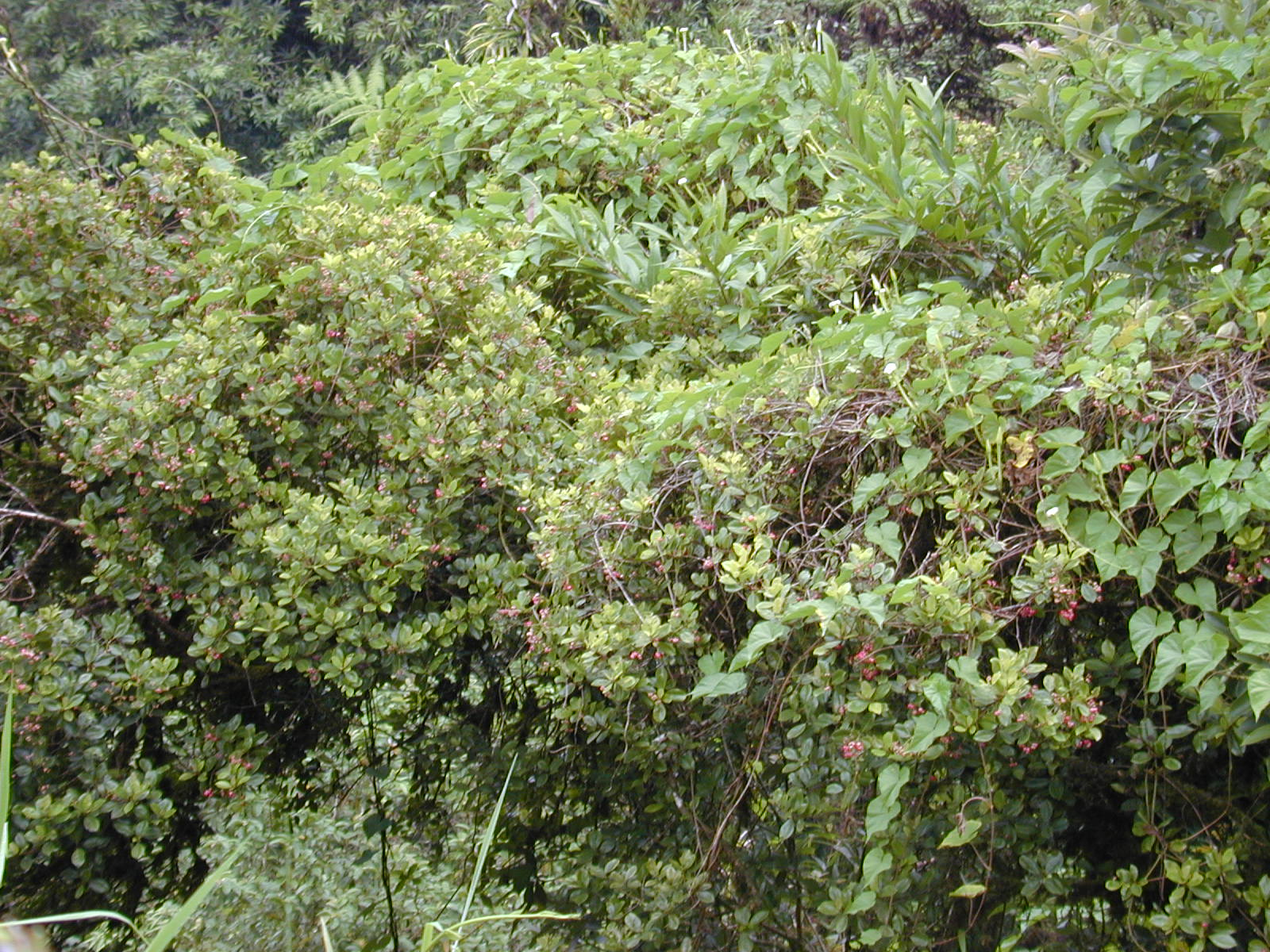

Conservation status
- Vulnerable (IUCN 3.1)

- Vulnerable (NatureServe)

Scientific classification
- Kingdom: Plantae
- Clade: Tracheophytes
- Clade: Angiosperms
- Clade: Eudicots
- Clade: Rosids
- Order: Myrtales
- Family: Myrtaceae
- Genus: Syzygium
- Species: S. sandwicense

Binomial name
- Syzygium sandwicense (A.Gray) Nied.

Synonyms
- Eugenia sandwicensis A.Gray; Syzygium oahuense O.Deg. & A.Ludw.

= Syzygium sandwicense =

Species of plant

Syzygium sandwicense is a species of flowering plant in the myrtle family, Myrtaceae, that is endemic to Hawaii. Common names include ʻŌhiʻa ha, Hā, and Pāʻihi. It is normally a large tree, reaching a height of 18 m (59 ft) and a trunk diameter of 0.9 m (3.0 ft), but is a shrub on exposed ridges. ʻŌhiʻa ha inhabits coastal mesic forests, mixed mesic forests, wet forests, and bogs at elevations of 230–1,220 m (750–4,000 ft) on most main islands.
