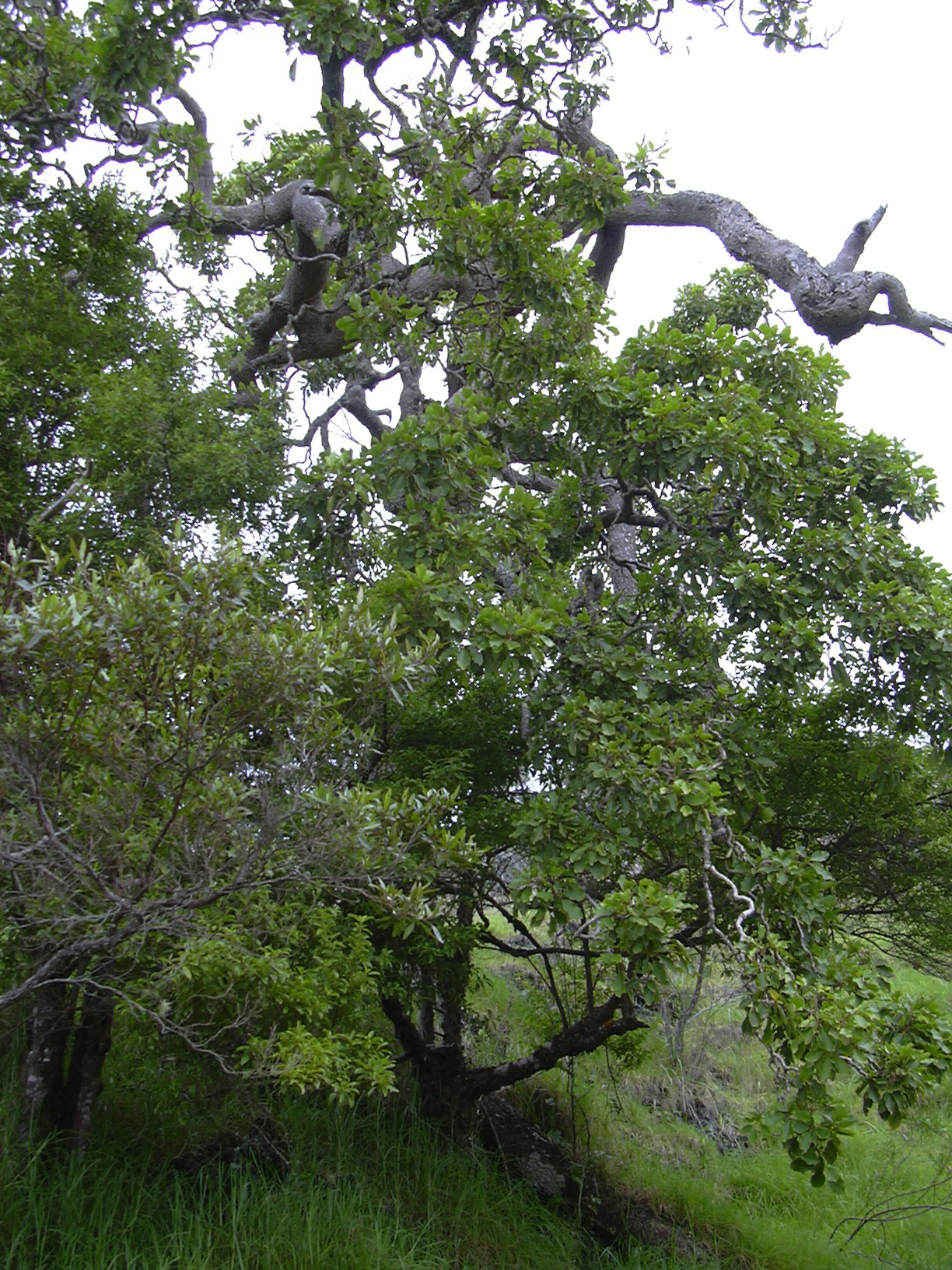

Scientific classification
- Kingdom: Plantae
- Clade: Tracheophytes
- Clade: Angiosperms
- Clade: Eudicots
- Clade: Asterids
- Order: Apiales
- Family: Araliaceae
- Genus: Cheirodendron
- Species: C. trigynum

Binomial name
- Cheirodendron trigynum (Gaudich.) Heller

= Cheirodendron trigynum =

Species of plant

Cheirodendron trigynum, also known as ʻŌlapa or common cheirodendron, is a species of flowering plant in the ginseng family, Araliaceae, that is endemic to Hawaii. It is a medium-sized tree, reaching a height of 12–15 m (39–49 ft) and a trunk diameter of 0.6 m (2.0 ft). ʻŌlapa inhabits mixed mesic and wet forests at elevations of 310–2,190 m (1,020–7,190 ft) on all main islands, where it is an abundant understory tree.
