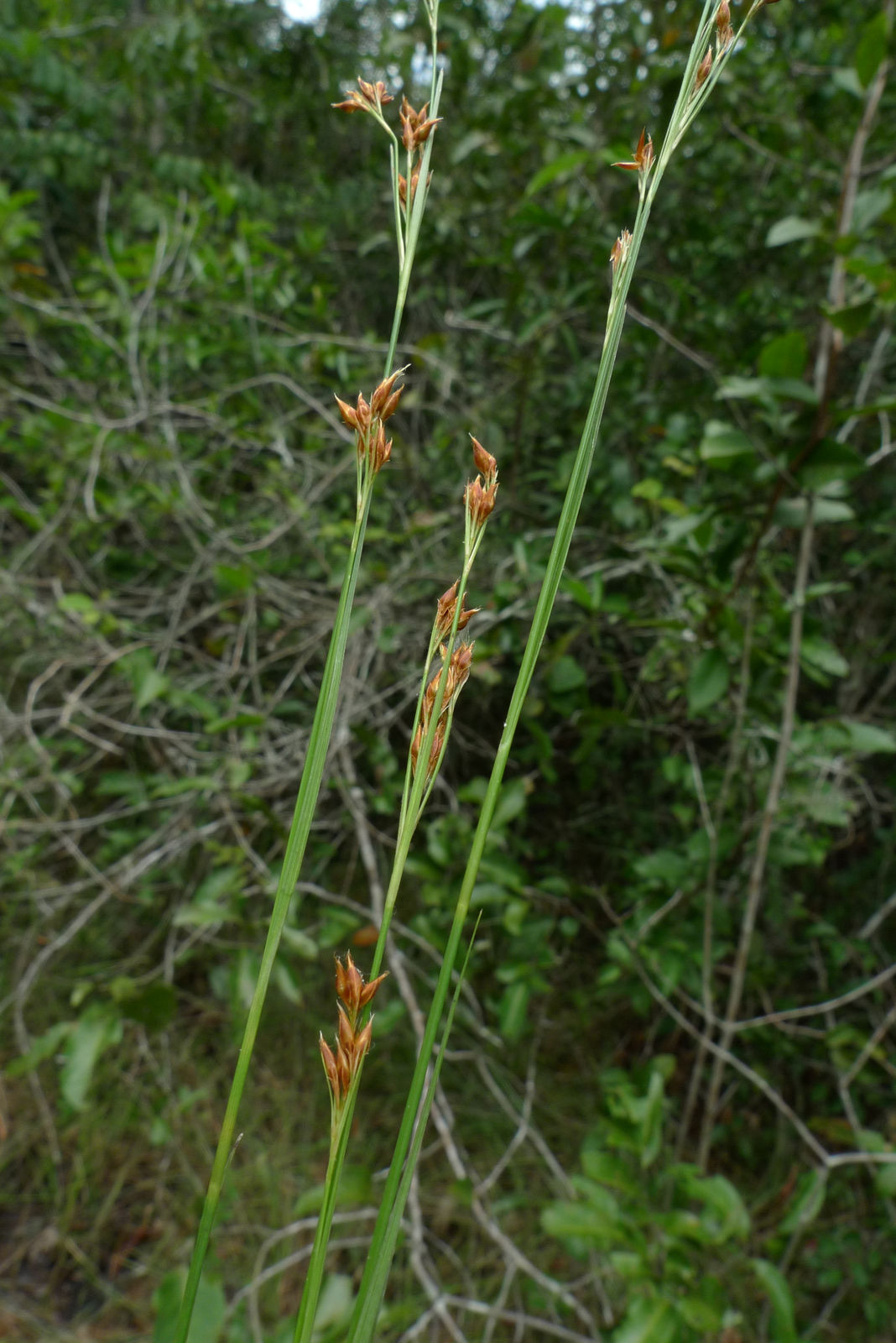

Conservation status
- Least Concern (IUCN 3.1)

Scientific classification
- Kingdom: Plantae
- Clade: Tracheophytes
- Clade: Angiosperms
- Clade: Monocots
- Clade: Commelinids
- Order: Poales
- Family: Cyperaceae
- Genus: Rhynchospora
- Species: R. rugosa

Binomial name
- Rhynchospora rugosa (Vahl) Gale (1944)

Infraspecific taxa
- Rhynchospora rugosa subsp. americana (Guagl.) Govaerts (2007); Rhynchospora rugosa subsp. lavarum (Gaudich.) T.Koyama (1989); Rhynchospora rugosa f. ponapensis (Hosok.) T.Koyama (1964); Rhynchospora rugosa subsp. rugosa (Vahl) Gale (1944)

Synonyms
- Synonymy: Dichromena glauca J.F.Macbr. (1929); Rhynchospora glauca Vahl (1805); Schoenus rugosus Vahl (1798); Rhynchospora durandiana Boeckeler (1896); Rhynchospora ferruginea Roem. & Schult. (1817); Rhynchospora laevigata Steud. (1855); Rhynchospora pauloensis Boeckeler (1890); Rhynchospora ponapensis Hosok. (1935); Rhynchospora pungens Liebm. (1850); Rhynchospora vicozensis Schult. (1824)

= Rhynchospora rugosa =

Claybank beaksedge

Species of plant

Rhynchospora rugosa, known by the common name of claybank beaksedge, is a member of the sedge family, Cyperaceae. It is a perennial herb, native to Central and South America.

Four subdivisions are accepted.

- Rhynchospora rugosa subsp. americana (Guagl.) Govaerts – southeastern Mexico, Central America, and Andean and southern South America
- Rhynchospora rugosa subsp. lavarum (Gaudich.) T.Koyama – Hawaiian Islands
- Rhynchospora rugosa f. ponapensis (Hosok.) T.Koyama – Caroline Islands (Pohnpei)
- Rhynchospora rugosa subsp. rugosa – Central Mexico to Central America, the Caribbean, and tropical South America

While Plants of the World Online accepts the African Rhynchospora brownii as an extant species, it is considered to be a subspecies of Rhynchospora rugosa by the Global Biodiversity Information Facility.
