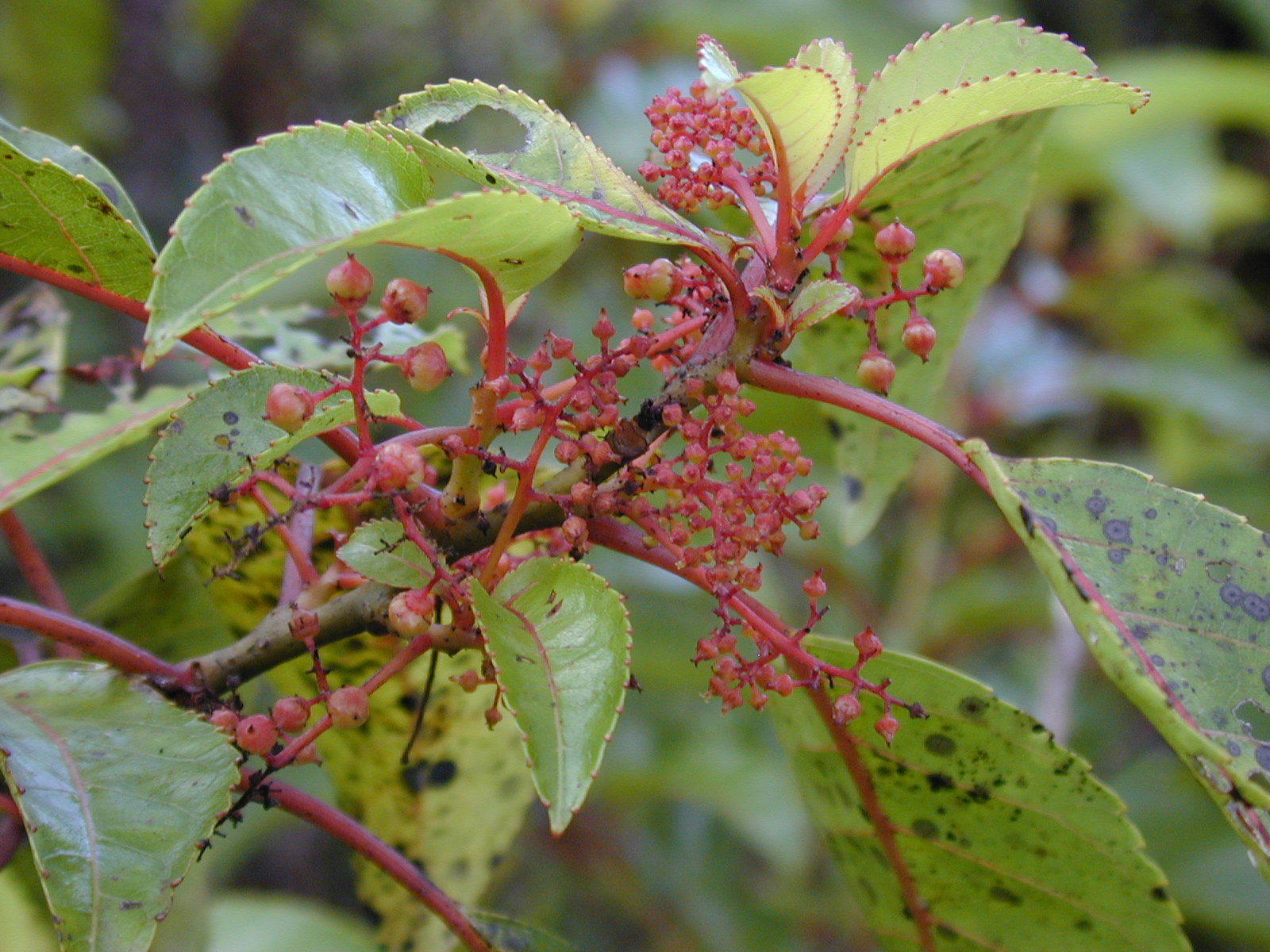
- Perrottetia sandwicensis

Scientific classification
- Kingdom: Plantae
- Clade: Tracheophytes
- Clade: Angiosperms
- Clade: Eudicots
- Clade: Rosids
- Order: Huerteales
- Family: Dipentodontaceae
- Genus: Perrottetia; Kunth

Type species
- Perrottetia quinduensis Kunth

Synonyms
- Caryospermum Blume

= Perrottetia =

Genus of plants

Perrottetia is a genus of flowering plants in the family Dipentodontaceae described in 1824. Species occur in China, Southeast Asia, Papuasia, Hawaii, Australia, and Latin America. It is the largest genus of the recently described order Huerteales.

== Taxonomy ==
This genus was previously placed in the staff vine family Celastraceae, but molecular evidence has shown that it was not related and better placed with Dipentodon in a separate family Dipentodontaceae.

== Species and subspecies ==
accepted taxa

- Perrottetia alpestris (Blume) Loes. - insular Southeast Asia, Papuasia, Queensland
  - subsp. moluccana (Blume) Ding Hou
  - subsp. philippinensis (S.Vidal) Ding Hou
- Perrottetia arisanensis Hayata - Yunnan, Taiwan
- Perrottetia caliensis Cuatrec. - Colombia
- Perrottetia calva Cuatrec. - Colombia
- Perrottetia colorata R.Sánchez & Fern.Alonso - Colombia
- Perrottetia distichophylla Cuatrec. - Colombia
- Perrottetia excelsa Lundell - Panama
- Perrottetia gentryi Lundell - Colombia, Peru, Bolivia
- Perrottetia guacharana R.Sánchez & Fern.Alonso - Colombia
- Perrottetia lanceolata H.Karst. - Venezuela
- Perrottetia longistylis Rose - S Mexico, Central America
- Perrottetia maxima Cuatrec. - Colombia
- Perrottetia multiflora Lundell - from Costa Rica to Peru
- Perrottetia ovata Hemsl. - C + S Mexico
- Perrottetia quinduensis Kunth - Venezuela, Colombia, Ecuador, Bolivia
- Perrottetia racemosa (Oliv.) Loes. - S China
- Perrottetia sandwicensis A.Gray – Olomea or Waimea - Hawaii
- Perrottetia sessiliflora Lundell - Chiapas, Costa Rica, Panama, Colombia, Ecuador, Peru
- Perrottetia simplicissima R.Sánchez & Fern.Alonso - Colombia
