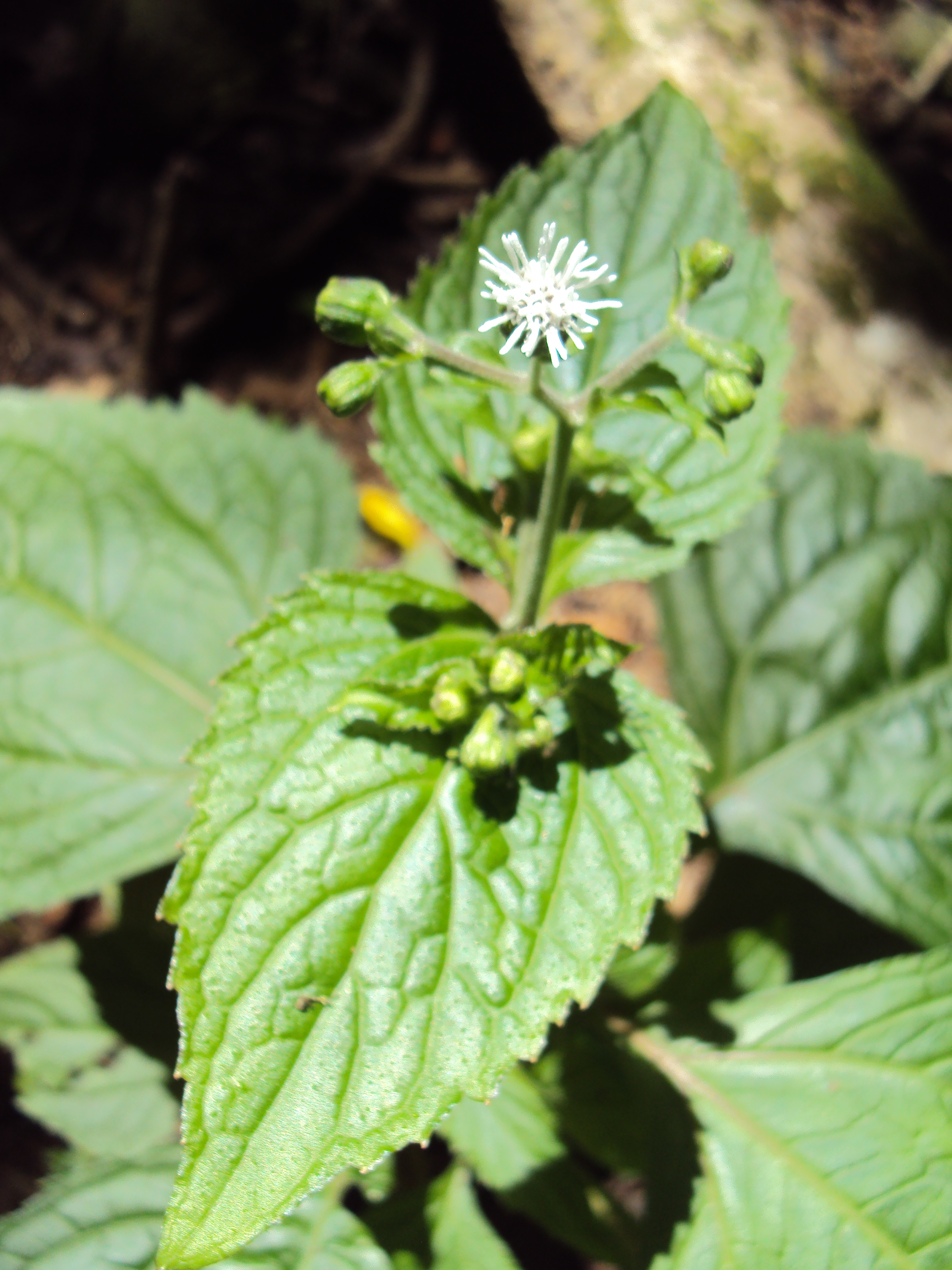
- Adenostomma lavenia

Scientific classification
- Kingdom: Plantae
- Clade: Tracheophytes
- Clade: Angiosperms
- Clade: Eudicots
- Clade: Asterids
- Order: Asterales
- Family: Asteraceae
- Subfamily: Asteroideae
- Tribe: Eupatorieae
- Genus: Adenostemma; J.R.Forst. & G.Forst., 1775

= Adenostemma =

Genus of plants

Adenostemma is a genus of flowering plant in the family Asteraceae described as a genus in 1775. It is widespread in tropical regions of Asia, Africa, Australia, the Americas, and various oceanic islands.

== Species ==
As of July 2020, Plants of the World online has 23 accepted species:

- Adenostemma afrum
- Adenostemma brasilianum Cass.
- Adenostemma cuatrecasasii
- Adenostemma flintii
- Adenostemma fosbergii
- Adenostemma goyazense
- Adenostemma harlingii
- Adenostemma hirsutum
- Adenostemma hirtiflorum
- Adenostemma involucratum
- Adenostemma lanceolatum
- Adenostemma lavenia
- Adenostemma madurense
- Adenostemma mauritianum
- Adenostemma platyphyllum
- Adenostemma renschiae
- Adenostemma renschii
- Adenostemma schimperi
- Adenostemma suffruticosum
- Adenostemma tinctorium
- Adenostemma vargasii
- Adenostemma verbesina
- Adenostemma viscosum
- Adenostemma vitiense
- Adenostemma zakii

Selected synonyms include:

- Adenostemma angustifolium Arn. — synonym of Adenostemma lavenia var. angustifolium (Arn.) Uniyal
- Adenostemma berteroi DC. — synonym of Adenostemma brasilianum Cass.

A. harlingii and A. zakii are examples of species endemic to Ecuador.
