= Hawaiian tropical rainforests =

Ecoregion of the Hawaiian Islands

Coordinates: 20°N 157°W

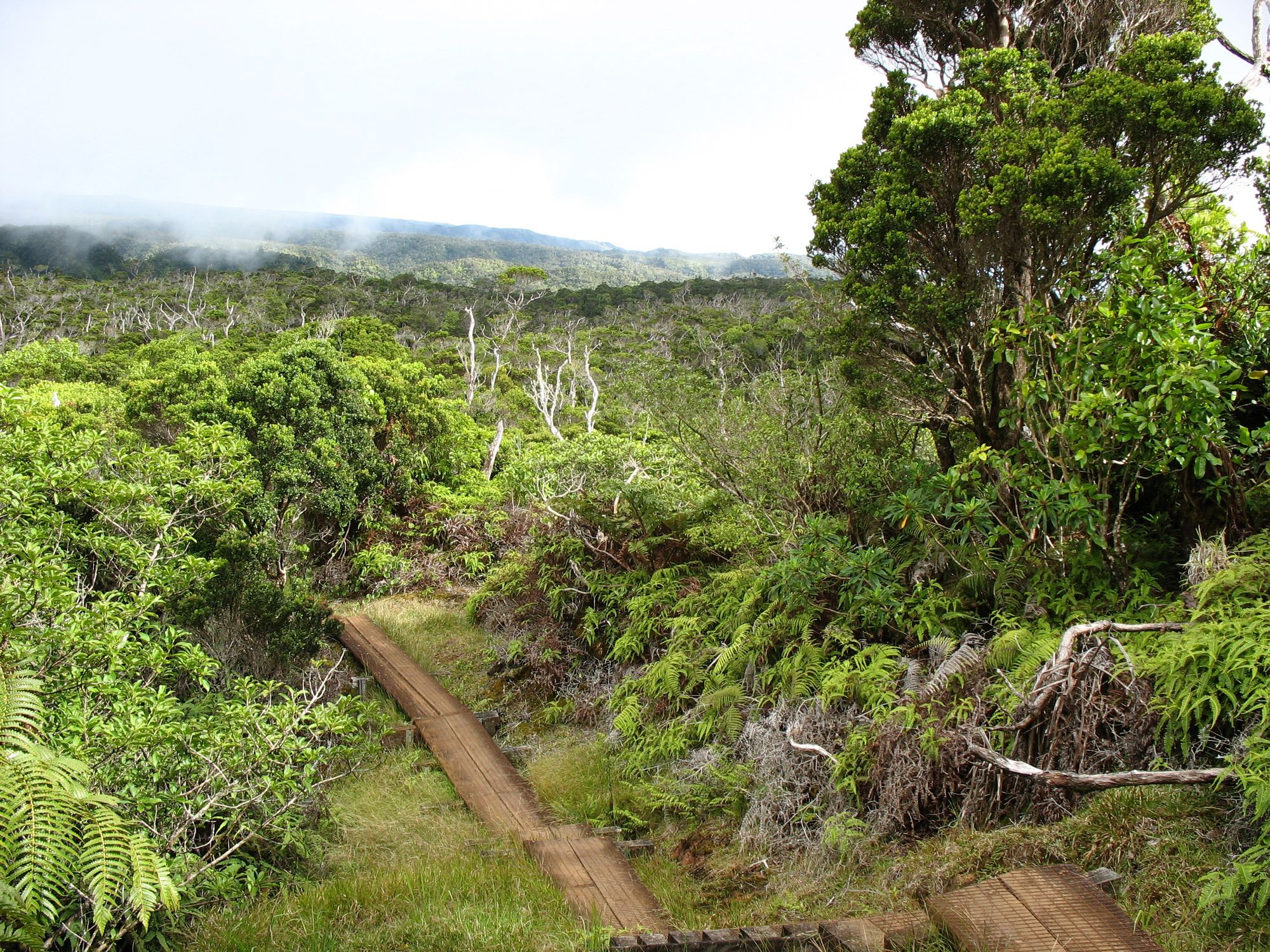
- Kauaʻi's Alakaʻi Wilderness Preserve

Ecology
- Realm: Oceanian
- Biome: Tropical and subtropical moist broadleaf forests
- Borders: Hawaiian tropical dry forests; Hawaiian tropical high shrublands

Geography
- Area: 6,700 km^{2} (2,600 sq mi)
- Country: United States
- State: Hawaii
- Climate type: Tropical rainforest (Af)

Conservation
- Conservation status: Critical/Endangered
- Global 200: Yes

The Hawaiian tropical rainforests are a tropical moist broadleaf forest ecoregion in the Hawaiian Islands. They cover an area of 6,700 km^{2} (2,600 sq mi) in the windward lowlands and montane regions of the islands. Coastal mesic forests are found at elevations from sea level to 300 m (980 ft). Mixed mesic forests occur at elevations of 750 to 1,250 m (2,460 to 4,100 ft), while wet forests are found from 1,250 to 1,700 m (4,100 to 5,580 ft). Moist bogs and shrublands exist on montane plateaus and depressions.

For the 28 million years of existence of the Hawaiian Islands, the tropical rainforests have been isolated from the rest of the world by vast stretches of the Pacific Ocean, and this isolation has resulted in the evolution of an incredible diversity of endemic species, including fungi, mosses, snails, birds, and other wildlife. In the lush, moist forests high in the mountains, trees are draped with vines, orchids, ferns, and mosses. This ecoregion includes one of the world's wettest places, the slopes of Mount Waiʻaleʻale, which average 373 in (9,500 mm) of rainfall per year.

== Coastal mesic forests ==
Coastal mesic forests are found on the windward slopes of the major islands from sea level to 300 m (980 ft). These forests have been dominated by the native hala (Pandanus tectorius) and hau (Hibiscus tiliaceus) and naturalized (Polynesian introductions) kukui (Aleurites moluccana) and milo (Thespesia populnea) for the past 1,000–2,000 years. The Polynesian-introduced noni (Morinda citrifolia), pia (Tacca leontopetaloides), and kī (Cordyline fruticosa) are also common in this zone. Other native species include pololei (Ophioglossum concinnum), ʻākia (Wikstroemia spp.), loulu fan palms (Pritchardia spp.), ʻōhiʻa lehua (Metrosideros polymorpha), and lama (Diospyros sandwicensis).

== Mixed mesic forests ==
Mixed mesic forests, at 750 to 1,250 m (2,460 to 4,100 ft) on the windward slopes of the large islands in addition to the summit of Mount Lānaʻihale on Lānaʻi, receive 1,000 to 2,500 mm (39 to 98 in) of rainfall annually and thus may not be true rainforests. The forest canopy, dominated by koa (Acacia koa) and ʻōhiʻa lehua (Metrosideros polymorpha), is somewhat open, but tree density is rather high. Other trees and shrubs include pāpala (Charpentiera obovata), olopua (Nestegis sandwicensis), hame (Antidesma platyphyllum), mēhame (A. pulvinatum), kōpiko (Psychotria mariniana), ʻōpiko (P. mauiensis), ʻiliahi (Santalum freycinetianum), hōlei (Ochrosia spp.), poʻolā (Claoxylon sandwicense), kōlea lau nui (Myrsine lessertiana), kauila (Alphitonia ponderosa), nioi (Eugenia reinwardtiana), aʻiaʻi (Paratrophis pendulina), and hōʻawa (Pittosporum spp.).

== Wet forests ==
Wet forests generally occur from 1,250 to 1,700 m (4,100 to 5,580 ft), but may be as low as 200 m (660 ft). They receive 3,000 to 11,250 mm (118 to 443 in) of rain per year. ʻŌhiʻa lehua (Metrosideros polymorpha) is the dominant canopy species in wet forests, but koa (Acacia koa) is also very common. Other trees include kāwaʻu (Ilex anomala), ʻalani (Melicope clusiifolia), ʻōhiʻa ha (Syzygium sandwicensis), kōlea lau nui (Myrsine lessertiana), ʻohe (Tetraplasandra spp.), and olomea (Perrottetia sandwicensis) as well as hāpuʻu (Cibotium tree ferns). ʻApeʻape (Gunnera petaloidea), ʻoha wai (Clermontia spp.), hāhā (Cyanea spp.), kāmakahala (Geniostoma hirtellum), kanawao (Broussaisia arguta), Phyllostegia spp., ʻākala (Rubus hawaiensis), kāmanamana (Adenostemma lavenia), Pilea peploides, māmaki (Pipturus albidus), olonā (Touchardia latifolia), and ʻalaʻala wai nui (Peperomia spp.) are common understory plants. Vines include maile (Alyxia oliviformis) and hoi kuahiwi (Smilax melastomifolia). ʻIeʻi.e. (Freycinetia arborea), puaʻakuhinia (Astelia menziesiana) and ʻōlapa (Cheirodendron trigynum) are epiphytic flowering plants found in wet forests. Epiphytic ferns, such as Adenophorus spp., ohiaku (Hymenophyllum recurvum), Ophioglossum pendulum, ʻākaha (Asplenium nidus), ʻēkaha (Elaphoglossum hirtum), and makue lau lii (Grammitis hookeri), cover trees. Epyphytic mosses include Acroporium fuscoflavum, Rhizogonium spiniforme, and Macromitrium owahiense. Loulu fan palms (Pritchardia spp.) may tower over the forest canopy.

Protected areas:

- Olaa Forest in the Hawaiʻi Volcanoes National Park.

== Bogs ==
Bogs are found in montane regions where rainfall exceeds drainage. Dominant vegetation in bogs are shrubs, sedges, and grasses. Larger shrubs and small trees grow on bog perimeters or on raised hummocks. Carex spp., Oreobolus furcatus, and Rhynchospora rugosa are common sedges, shrubs include ʻōhelo kau laʻau (Vaccinium calycinum) and ʻōhelo (V. dentatum), while grasses are represented by Dichanthelium spp. and Deschampsia nubigena. Dwarf varieties of ʻōhiʻa lehua (Metrosideros polymorpha vars. incana and glabriofolia) are the most seen trees on the edges of bogs. The ferns wāwaeʻiole (Lycopodiella cernua), ʻamaʻu (Sadleria spp.), and uluhe (Dicranopteris linearis) grow in bogs. Rare plants include liliwai (Acaena exigua), naʻenaʻe (Dubautia spp.), and Argyroxiphium spp.

== See also ==
- Big Bog, Maui
- Hawaiian tropical dry forests
- List of ecoregions in the United States (WWF)
- Oceanian realm
