= Auwahi Dryland Forest Restoration Project =

Forest restoration project on Maui, Hawaii

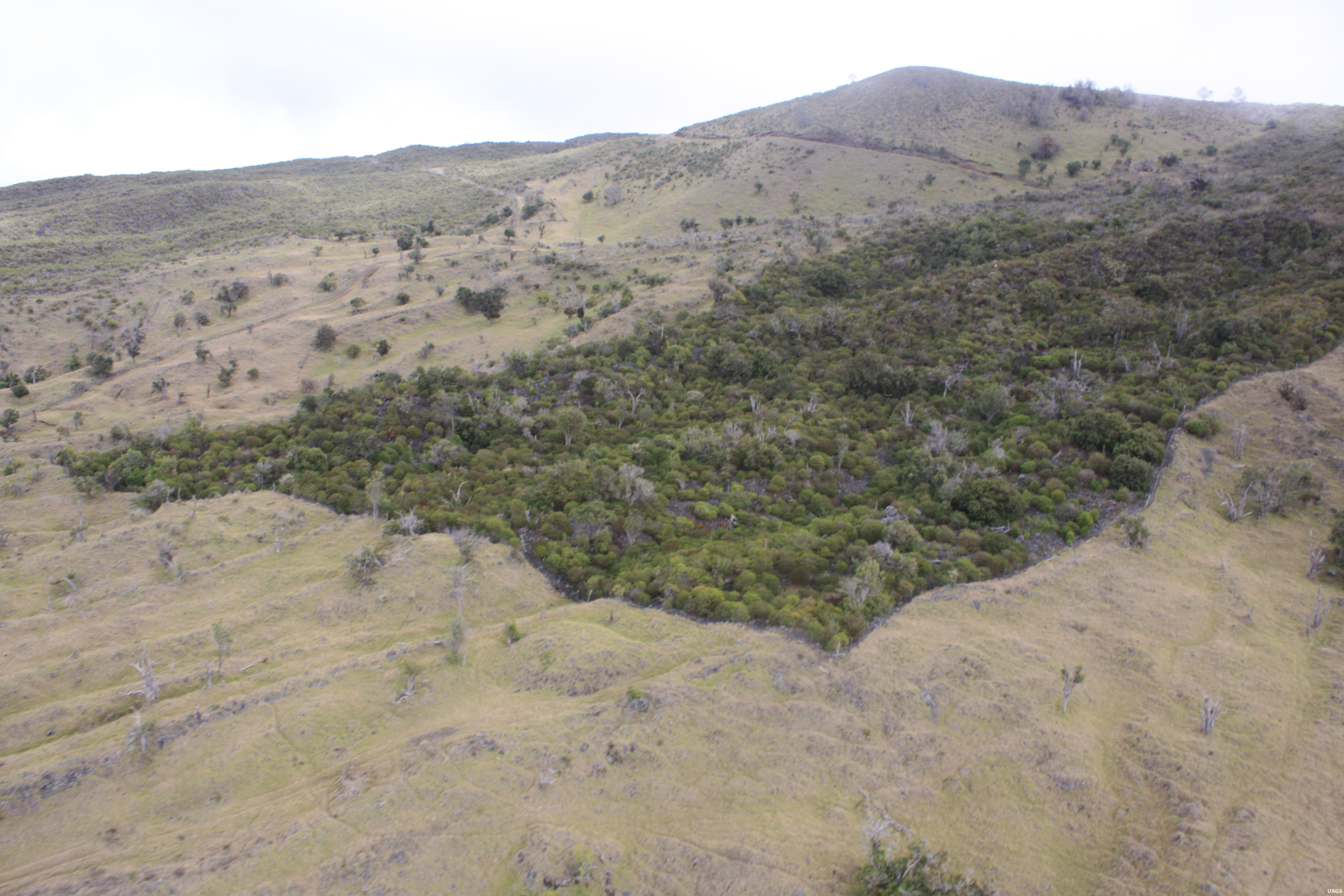
Auwahi Dryland Forest

The Auwahi Dryland Forest Restoration Project has produced a substantial forest on the southwestern slopes of Haleakala on the island of Maui. The mostly volunteer-based restoration focuses on the 4,000-foot elevation range.

== History ==
Pre-contact dryland forest ecosystems were reduced to less than five percent of their original range by clearing, grazing and invasive species in the late 1800s. The wood went to fuel the boilers at sugarcane mills and to make charcoal. By the early 1900s, the land was almost totally bereft of `ohi`a and koa trees. Kikuyu grass was imported in the 1940s and became pervasive.

Restoration was initiated in 1997 by fencing a 10-acre area of Ulupalakua Ranch, using U.S. Fish and Wildlife Service funds. It was led by retired United States Geological Survey biologist Art Medeiros.

In June 2003, the Leeward Haleakala Watershed Restoration Partnership was formed and supported the project. The partnership brought eight large landowners (holding 43,715 acres) together to better manage the watershed on Haleakala's southwestern rift zone.

By 2012, native cover had increased from 3 percent to 82 percent by 2012 within the project area. 14 of 22 native tree species and six of seven native shrub species had successfully reproduced in restoration plots. 99% were native 'o'hia, Coprosma foliosa, Osteomeles anthyllidifolia, Chamaesyce celastoides, Nestegis sandwicensis and nonnative Bocconia frutescens. Stem counts had increased from 12.4 to 135.0/100 m2, and native species diversity increased from 2.4 to 6.6/100 m2. Reproducing species included two types of sandalwood – iliahi and iliahialoe. Mauila and hao (also the word for iron in the Hawaiian language) were present.

== Habitat ==
More than 50 native species are found in the Auwahi region, including six endangered and five of concern.

Native tree species are susceptible to Fusarium oxysporum, a vascular wilt fungus that is fatal to trees of all sizes.

== Goals ==
Goals include:

- supporting native species diversity,
- establishing a biological preserve,
- enhancing watershed resources,
- recharging the aquifer,
- linking Hawaiian culture and crafts with a sustainable silviculture industry,
- providing jobs to support rural lifestyles,
- economic diversification
- hosting native birds that once populated that region, but migrated to the rainy windward forests to face mosquito-borne avian malaria.

== Process ==
Reforestation areas are fenced, and feral pigs, goats and axis deer are removed to prevent them from eating saplings and destroying habitat. Next, herbicide is applied to remove invasive plant species. Then 'a'ali'i are planted to prevent invasives from reclaiming the area. After the 'a'ali'i have grown to height of six or more feet, other native tree sapling are planted.

The project organizes monthly site visits carrying 20 to 30 volunteers. Volunteers plant saplings, gather seeds and pull weeds.
