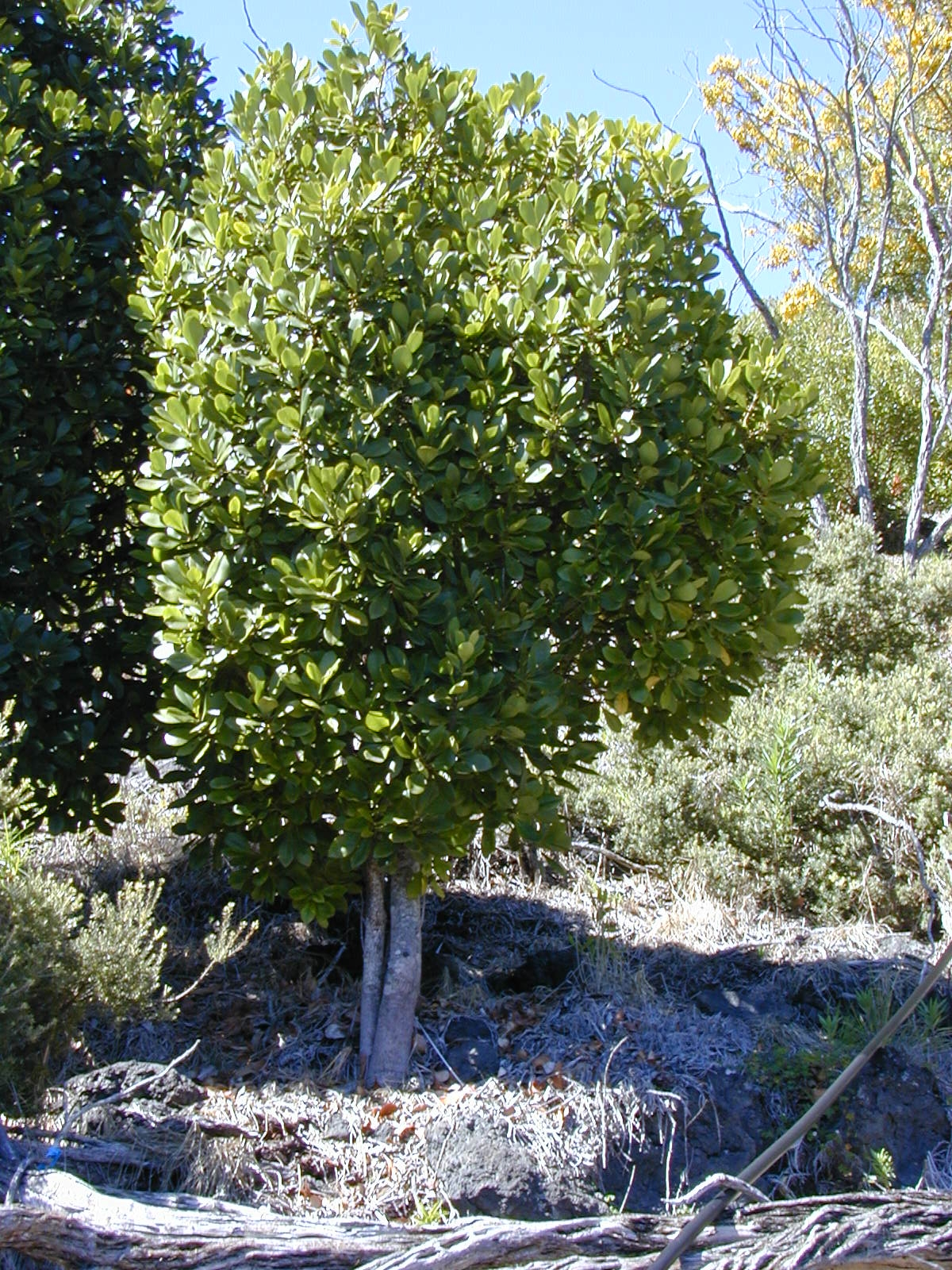

Conservation status
- Least Concern (IUCN 3.1)

- Vulnerable (NatureServe)

Scientific classification
- Kingdom: Plantae
- Clade: Tracheophytes
- Clade: Angiosperms
- Clade: Eudicots
- Clade: Asterids
- Order: Ericales
- Family: Primulaceae
- Genus: Myrsine
- Species: M. lessertiana

Binomial name
- Myrsine lessertiana A.DC.

Synonyms
- Myrsine emarginata (Rock) Hosaka, fossil name; Myrsine fauriei H.Lév.; Myrsine fosbergii var. acuminata (Wawra) Hosaka; Myrsine gaudichaudii A.DC.; Myrsine gaudichaudii f. acuminata Wawra; Myrsine meziana (H.Lév.) Wilbur; Rapanea emarginata (Rock) O.Deg. & I.Deg.; Rapanea fosbergii var. acuminata (Wawra) O.Deg. & I.Deg.; Rapanea lessertiana (A.DC.) O.Deg. & Hosaka; Rapanea spathulata (Rock) O.Deg. & Hosaka; Suttonia fauriei (H.Lév.) H.Lév.; Suttonia flavida H.Lév.; Suttonia hillebrandii var. emarginata Rock; Suttonia lessertiana (A.DC.) MezSuttonia cuneata H.Lév.; Suttonia meziana H.Lév.; Suttonia spathulata Rock

= Myrsine lessertiana =

Species of plant

Myrsine lessertiana, the kōlea lau nui, is a species of colicwood endemic to the U.S. state of Hawaii in the family Primulaceae. It inhabits Hawaiian tropical dry, coastal mesic, mixed mesic, and wet forests at elevations of 210–1,220 m (690–4,000 ft) on the main Hawaiian islands. M. lessertiana is a small to medium-sized tree, reaching a height of 18 m (59 ft) with a trunk diameter of 0.3–0.6 m (0.98–1.97 ft). Most are founded on the main Hawaiian islands of Oahu, Kauai, and Maui with flowers blooming during spring, less during the fall, and flowers that peak during winter seasons.

== Taxonomy ==
Myrsine lessertiana is found to have a total of three clades. The first clade is found only on Oahu and Kauai which is further divided into two subcategories of the clades based on leaf shapes and genomic datasets. The second clade consists of variations from other islands such as M. pukooensis and M. vaccinioides. The third clade consists of two specimens of Myrsine lessertiana. These clades form lineages that establish it as monophyletic with Myrsine lanaiensis.

== Habitat ==
Myrsine lessertiana has proven to be suitable candidate for native Hawaiian forest restoration because the species thrives in wet lowland forests with low lighting and grows well at high elevations.

== Uses ==
Native Hawaiians used kōlea lau nui wood to make papa olonā (Touchardia latifolia scrapers), kua kuku (kapa anvils), pou (house posts), kaola (beams), pale (gunwales), and manu (ornamental end pieces) for waʻa (outrigger canoes). Kōlea lau nui bark was boiled in water to make hili kōlea (a deep red dye), which was then used on kapa (bark cloth). During ancient times, Native Hawaiians also used the kōlea lau nui for canoes, used the charcoal for black dye, and its wood is still used today for crafting.

== See also ==
- Auwahi Dryland Forest Restoration Project
