= Otto Herman Swezey =

American entomologist

Otto Herman Swezey (7 June 1869 – 3 November 1959) was an American entomologist who was an expert on the insects of Hawaii, especially the Lepidoptera. He described numerous species and many taxa, like the psyllid genus Swezeyana, have been named in his honour by other entomologists.

Swezey was born in Rockford, Illinois to Adoniram Judson and Malinda Bruner. He studied at Guilford Centre School House and received a BA from Lake Forest College, Illinois in 1896. He obtained a MA from Northwestern University, Illinois. He studied entomology at the Ohio State University from 1902 to 1903 under Herbert Osborn. He worked in the Ohio State Department of Agriculture from 1903 to 1904. He investigated an outbreak of Perkinsiella saccharicida in Hawaii working with the Hawaiian sugar planters. After retirement in 1933 he worked at the Bernice P. Bishop Museum. Swezey received an honorary doctorate from the University of Hawaii in 1944. He served as the editor for the Proceedings of the Hawaiian Entomological Society. Apart from insects of importance to sugarcane cultivation, Swezey studied the insects of Guam and Samoa. He also published on the forest insects of Hawaii. He married Mary Hypatia Walsh in 1904 just before moving to Hawaii and they had one son.
