= Primitive koa finch =

Primitive koa finch Temporal range: Holocene

Scientific classification
- Kingdom: Animalia
- Phylum: Chordata
- Class: Aves
- Order: Passeriformes
- Family: Fringillidae
- Subfamily: Carduelinae
- Genus: †Rhodacanthis
- Species: †R. litotes

Binomial name
- †Rhodacanthis litotes James & Olson, 2005

Extinct species of bird

The primitive koa finch (Rhodacanthis litotes) is an extinct species of Hawaiian honeycreeper in the subfamily Carduelinae of the family Fringillidae. It is known from fossils on the islands of Maui and Oʻahu in Hawaii.

== Description ==
An adult primitive koa finch was slender and had a total length of about 8 inches (200 mm). There was probably a small distinct difference between the sexes. Based on fossils, it is known that the adult primitive koa finch had a slightly curved, thick bill.

The paper that named the species in 2005 also mentions, "the fossil record of Rhodacanthis may contain at least one additional cryptic species. The difference in aperture of the nasal cavity in the Oahu vs. Maui fossils of R. litotes suggests that those two populations might be recognized as distinct species if more fossils or genetic data were available for them."

== Distribution ==
Primitive koa finch fossils have been found on Maui and Oʻahu. Based on its disjunct distribution, the species might have occurred on all of the main islands (except the island of Hawaii and perhaps Kauai), although more fossils are needed for confirmation.

It is believed that it inhabited lowland dry forests and savannas, where dominant plant species included ka palupalu o kanaloa (Kanaloa kahoolawensis), ʻaʻaliʻi (Dodonaea viscosa), loulu (Pritchardia spp.), and koaiʻa (Acacia koaia). Unlike other species of Rhodacanthis, koa (Acacia koa) was not present in significant numbers in its habitat.

== Diet ==
The primitive koa finch was a granivore, with a bill adapted to eat the hard seeds and pods of legumes, especially ka palupalu o kanaloa (Kanaloa kahoolawensis) and koaiʻa (Acacia koaia). It may have also taken caterpillars and ʻaʻaliʻi (Dodonaea viscosa) berries, as these were observed being eaten by other species in the genus.

== Extinction ==
The koa finches seem to have been driven to extinction by habitat destruction, and not by climatic variation nor mosquito-vectored diseases. Koa finches were likely driven out of lowland habitat before or shortly after the time of western contact in 1778. The two species from Maui (the scissor-billed koa finch and primitive koa finch) might have survived in an upland refugium until the late 19th century, paralleling the fate of the two species from the island of Hawaii (the lesser and greater koa finches). However, the only verified records of the Maui species are from fossils at a lower elevation.
