= Scissor-billed koa finch =

Scissor-billed koa finch Temporal range: Early Holocene

Scientific classification
- Kingdom: Animalia
- Phylum: Chordata
- Class: Aves
- Order: Passeriformes
- Family: Fringillidae
- Subfamily: Carduelinae
- Genus: †Rhodacanthis
- Species: †R. forfex

Binomial name
- †Rhodacanthis forfex James & Olson, 2005

Extinct species of bird

The scissor-billed koa finch or scissor finch (Rhodacanthis forfex) is an extinct species of Hawaiian honeycreeper in the subfamily Carduelinae of the family Fringillidae. It is known from fossils on the islands of Maui and Kauaʻi in Hawaii.

== Distribution ==
Scissor-billed koa finch fossils have been found on Maui and Kauai. Based on its disjunct distribution, the species might have occurred on all of the main islands (except the island of Hawaii), although more fossils are needed for confirmation.

== Diet ==
The scissor-billed koa finch was a granivore, that, like the other members of its genus, had a bill adapted to eat the hard seeds and pods of legumes. Pollen and fossil evidence indicates that Ka palupalu o Kanaloa (Kanaloa kahoolawensis) and koaiʻa (Acacia koaia) were probably important food sources, and it may have eaten caterpillars and ʻaʻaliʻi (Dodonaea viscosa) berries.

== Extinction ==
The koa finches seem to have been driven to extinction by habitat destruction, and not by climatic variation nor mosquito-vectored diseases. Koa finches were likely driven out of lowland habitat before or shortly after the time of western contact in 1778. The two species from Maui (the scissor-billed koa finch and primitive koa finch) might have survived in an upland refugium until the late 19th century, paralleling the fate of the two species from the island of Hawaii (the lesser and greater koa finches). However, the only verified records of the Maui species are from fossils at a lower elevation.
