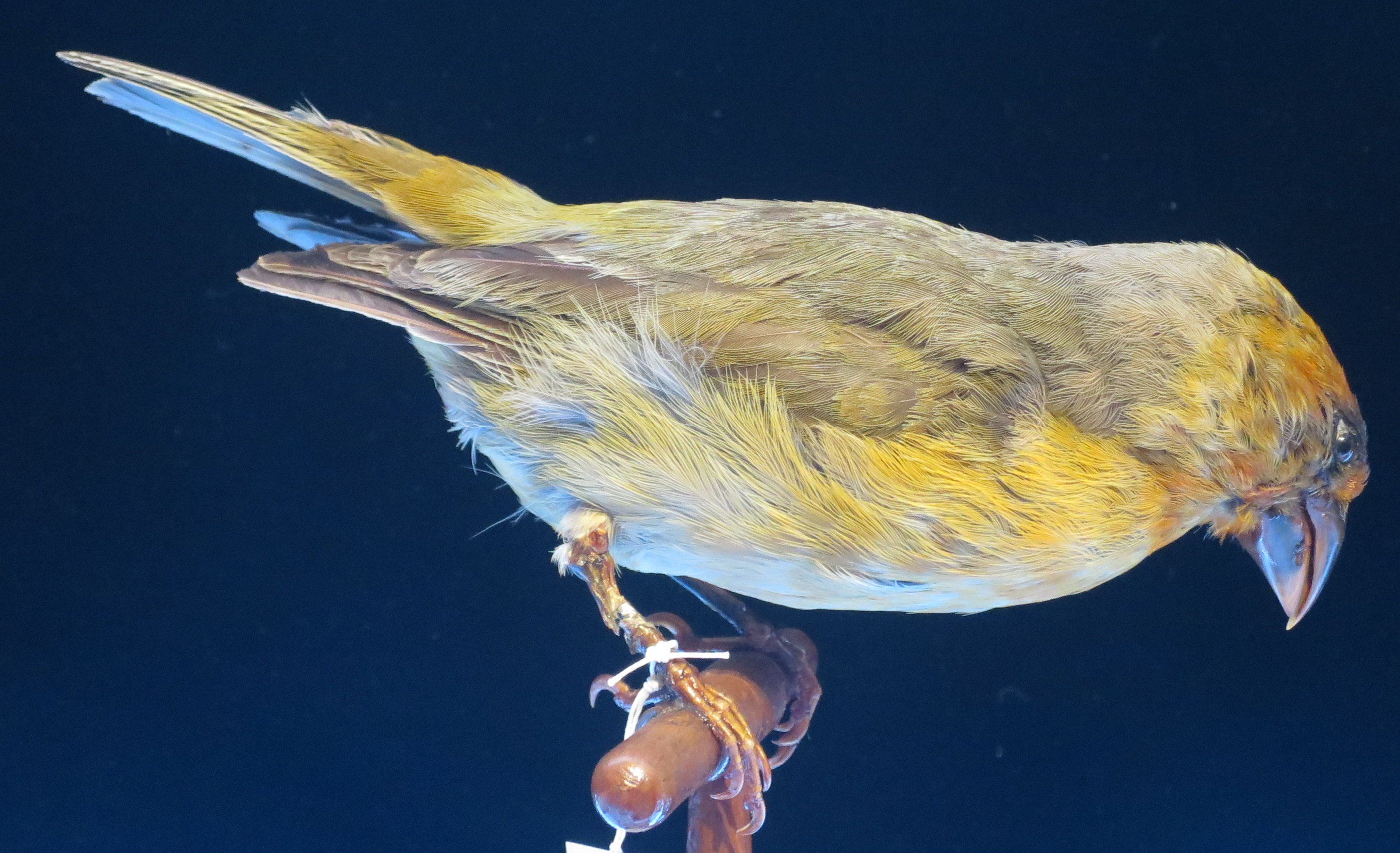
- Greater koa finch (R. palmeri)

Scientific classification
- Kingdom: Animalia
- Phylum: Chordata
- Class: Aves
- Order: Passeriformes
- Family: Fringillidae
- Subfamily: Carduelinae
- Genus: †Rhodacanthis; Rothschild, 1892

Type species
- Rhodacanthis palmeri Rothschild, 1891

Species
- Rhodacanthis flaviceps Rhodacanthis forfex Rhodacanthis litotes Rhodacanthis palmeri

= Rhodacanthis =

Rhodacanthis Temporal range: Holocene

Extinct genus of birds

Rhodacanthis, commonly known as the koa finches, is an extinct genus of Hawaiian honeycreeper in the subfamily Carduelinae of the family Fringillidae. All four species were endemic to Hawaii.

== Habitat and diet ==
Members of this genus were granivores, with bills adapted to the seeds and pods of legumes. The two species that became extinct in the 1890s, R. flaviceps and R. palmeri, inhabited upper elevation mesic forests dominated by koa (Acacia koa) on the island of Hawaiʻi. Both were large birds; R. flaviceps measured 19 cm (7.5 in), while R. palmeri was 23 cm (9.1 in) in length. The combination of a giant bill with brightly colored plumage (yellow for R. flaviceps, orange for R. palmeri) gave the males a very striking appearance. Koa seeds were the preferred food for the two species, but caterpillars were taken if necessary. The two prehistoric species, R. forfex and R. litotes, were denizens of more lowland tropical dry forests and shrublands on Kauaʻi, Maui, and Oʻahu. It is speculated that koaiʻa (Acacia koaia) was an important food source for both species, as their range did not overlap with that of koa. Kanaloa (Kanaloa spp.) pods and ʻaʻaliʻi (Dodonaea viscosa) berries were probably also eaten in addition to the occasional caterpillar.

== Species ==
Image	Common name	Scientific name
	†Lesser koa finch (extinct, 1891)	†Rhodacanthis flaviceps Rothschild, 1892
	†Scissor-billed koa finch (prehistoric)	†Rhodacanthis forfex James & Olson, 2005
	†Primitive koa finch (prehistoric)	†Rhodacanthis litotes James & Olson, 2005
	†Greater koa finch (extinct, 1896)	†Rhodacanthis palmeri Rothschild, 1892

== See also ==
- James, Helen F.; Storrs L. Olson (2005). "The diversity and biogeography of koa-finches (Drepanidini: Rhodacanthis), with descriptions of two new species" (PDF). Zoological Journal of the Linnean Society. 144 (4). Linnean Society of London: 527–541. doi:10.1111/j.1096-3642.2005.00173.x.
