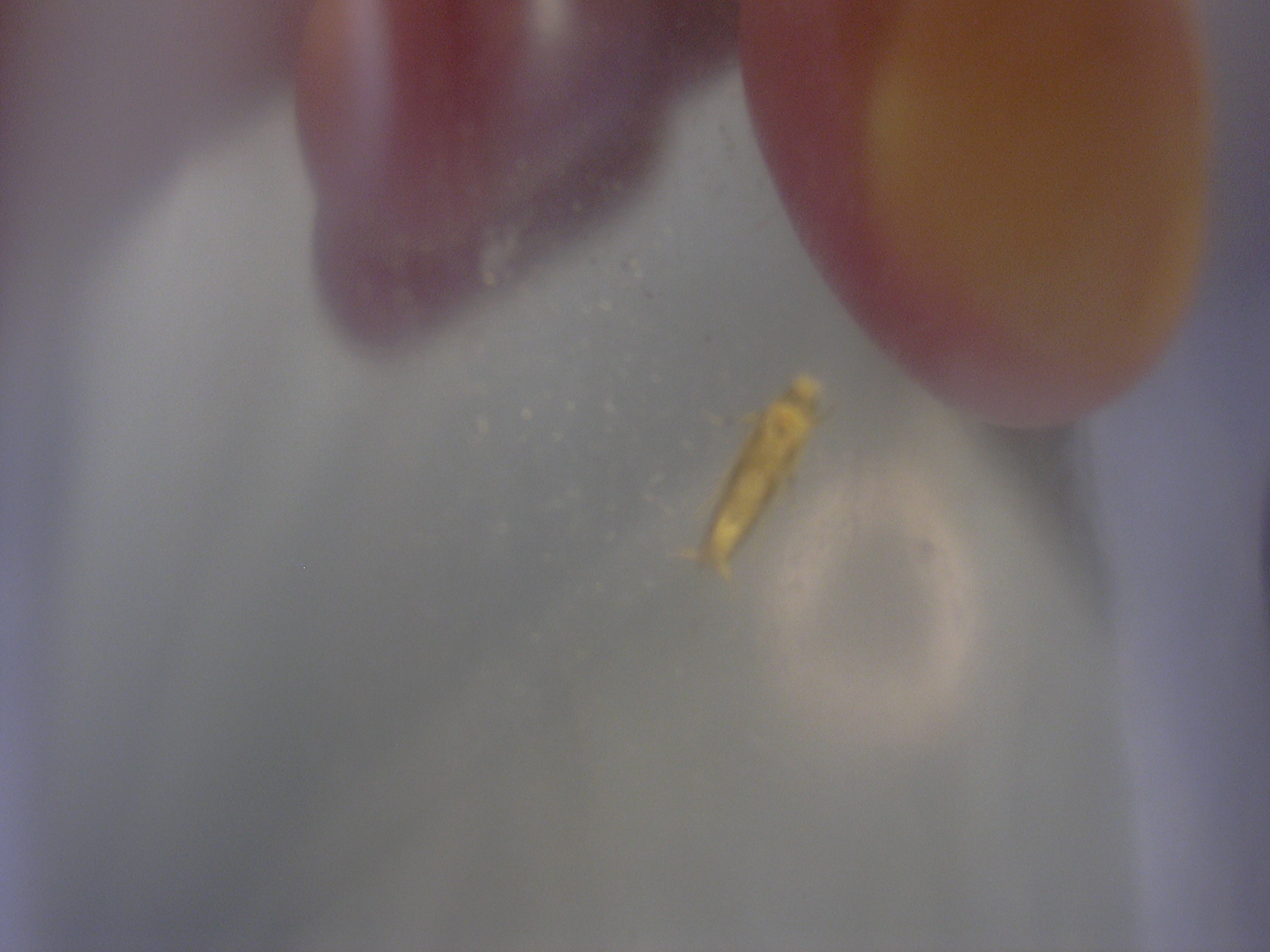

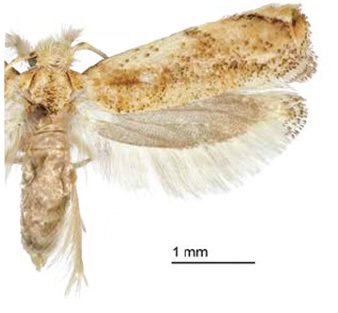

Scientific classification
- Kingdom: Animalia
- Phylum: Arthropoda
- Clade: Pancrustacea
- Class: Insecta
- Order: Lepidoptera
- Family: Tineidae
- Genus: Erechthias
- Species: E. minuscula

Binomial name
- Erechthias minuscula (Walsingham, 1897)

Synonyms
- Ereunetis minuscula Walsingham, 1897; Lepidobregma minuscula; Decadarchis minuscula

= Erechthias minuscula =

Species of moth

Erechthias minuscula, the erechthias clothes moth, is a moth of the family Tineidae. It was first described by Lord Walsingham in 1897. It is widespread and has been recorded from Africa, Sri Lanka, Java, Australia, the Caroline Islands, Fiji, Samoa, the Marquesas, the West Indies, Hawaii and Florida.

== Description ==
The length of the forewings is 3.5–4 mm.

== Pest attack ==
Recorded plant material used as food includes Acacia koa, Acacia koaia, banana, Calotropis, Cassia, eggplant, fig, Lantana, palms, Pandanus, papaya, pineapple, Pipturus, Sapindus oahuensis, Sicana odorifera as well as old tamarind pods.
