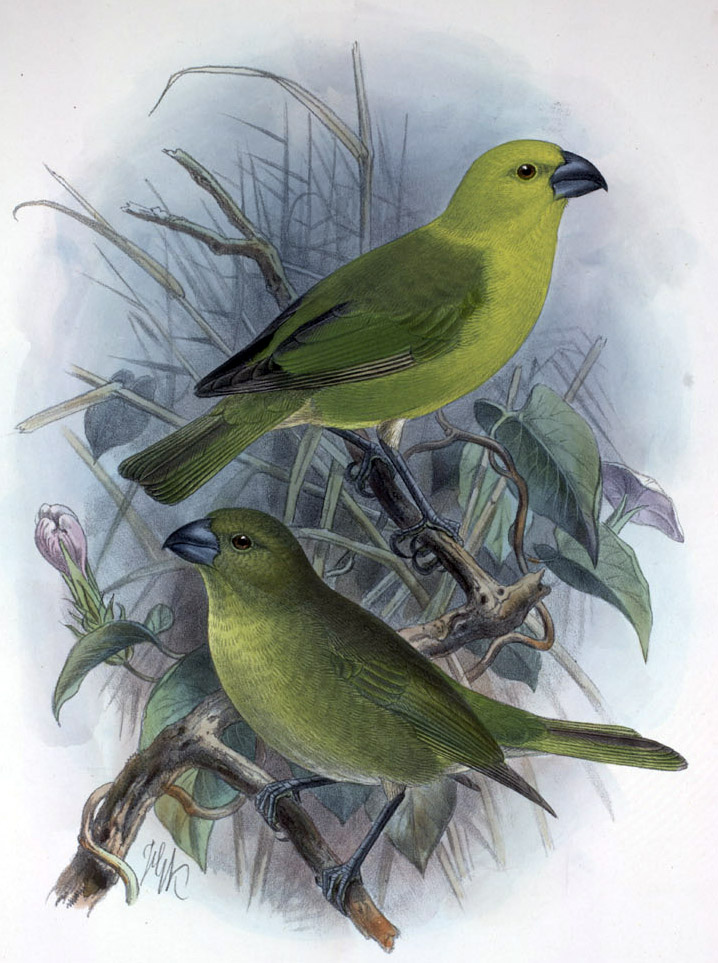

Conservation status
- Extinct (1891) (IUCN 3.1)

Scientific classification
- Kingdom: Animalia
- Phylum: Chordata
- Class: Aves
- Order: Passeriformes
- Family: Fringillidae
- Subfamily: Carduelinae
- Genus: †Rhodacanthis
- Species: †R. flaviceps

Binomial name
- †Rhodacanthis flaviceps Rothschild, 1892

= Lesser koa finch =

Extinct species of bird

The lesser koa finch (Rhodacanthis flaviceps) is an extinct species of Hawaiian honeycreeper in the subfamily Carduelinae of the family Fringillidae. It was endemic to the island of Hawaiʻi.

== Description ==
The only specimens of the lesser koa finch ever caught were a family group with members of different ages and sex, ideal for study. The males were apparently golden-yellow with olive green on the breast and belly. The females were almost indistinguishable from the species' larger relative, the greater koa finch (Rhodacanthis palmeri), other than the fact that the former were slightly darker in color. The juveniles were somewhat mottled on the belly, similar to the females.

== Distribution and habitat ==
The lesser koa finch was endemic to the island of Hawaiʻi. This species was recorded in upland koa (Acacia koa) forests, but likely inhabited lowland habitat until before or shortly after the time of western contact in 1778.

The IUCN Red List says, "This or a similar species is also known from the fossil record of O'ahu and Maui," citing a 1991 paper. This apparently refers to the primitive koa finch (Rhodacanthis litotes), a similarly sized species known from fossils on Oʻahu and Maui, described as a new species in 2005.

== Behavior ==
Its life cycle and feeding habits apparently centered around the koa plant from which it got nectar and fruit (and for which it was named). The koa also provided refuge for small flocks of the finch as it avoided people and the noon high sun. It was seen congregating with its larger relative, the greater koa finch (Rhodacanthis palmeri). Several specimens were collected and sent to London, Cambridge, New York, Philadelphia, and Berlin.

== Extinction ==
The extinction of this species and other koa finches seems to have been caused by habitat destruction, and not by climatic variation nor mosquito-vectored diseases. Koa finches were likely driven out of lowland habitat and into upland refugia before or shortly after the time of western contact in 1778. On the island of Hawaiʻi, koa finches persisted until the late 19th century, when their upland refugium was degraded by logging, ranching, and intensified predation by the black rat. The lesser koa finch was last recorded in 1891.
