= Hawaiian tropical dry forests =

Ecoregion of the Hawaiian Islands

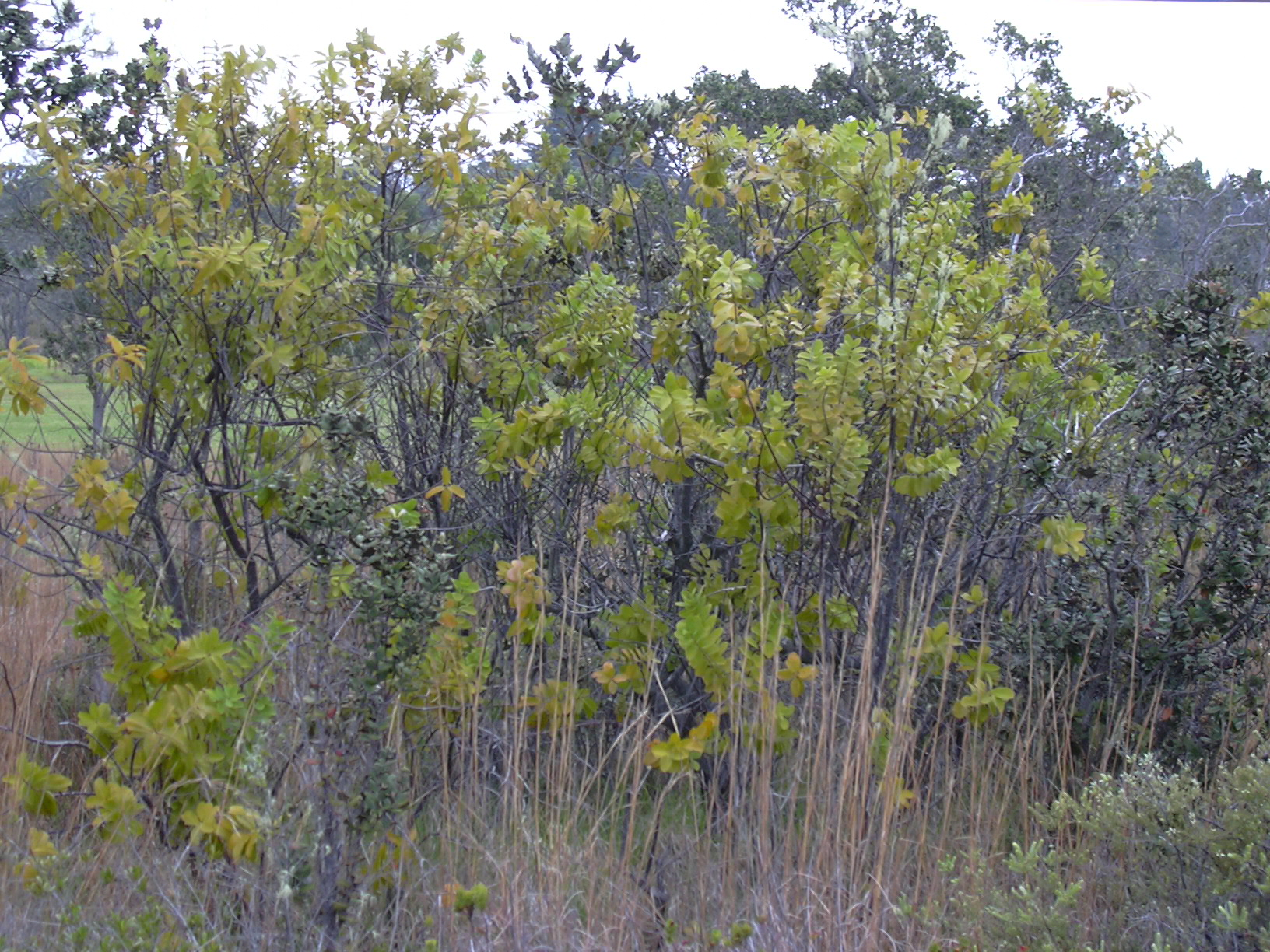
- An ʻiliahi (Santalum paniculatum) at Hawaiʻi Volcanoes National Park.

Ecology
- Realm: Oceanian
- Biome: Tropical and subtropical dry broadleaf forests
- Borders: Hawaiian tropical low shrublands; Hawaiian tropical rainforests; Hawaiian tropical high shrublands

Geography
- Area: 6,600 km^{2} (2,500 sq mi)
- Country: United States
- State: Hawaii
- Coordinates: 21°N 157°W
- Climate type: Hot semi-arid (BSh) and tropical savanna (Aw)

Conservation
- Conservation status: Critical/Endangered
- Global 200: Yes

Hawaiian tropical dry forests are a tropical dry broadleaf forest ecoregion in the Hawaiian Islands. They cover an area of 6,600 km^{2} (2,500 sq mi) on the leeward side of the main islands and the summits of Niʻihau and Kahoʻolawe. These forests are either seasonal or sclerophyllous. Annual rainfall is less than 127 cm (50 in) and may be as low as 25 cm (9.8 in). The rainy season there lasts from November to March.

Dominant tree species include koa (Acacia koa), koaiʻa (A. koaia), ʻakoko (Euphorbia spp.), ʻōhiʻa lehua (Metrosideros polymorpha), lonomea (Sapindus oahuensis), māmane (Sophora chrysophylla), loulu (Pritchardia spp.), lama (Diospyros sandwicensis), olopua (Nestegis sandwicensis), wiliwili (Erythrina sandwicensis), ʻohe makai (Polyscias sandwicensis), and ʻiliahi (Santalum spp.). Endemic plant species include hau heleʻula (Kokia cookei), uhiuhi (Caesalpinia kavaiensis), and Gouania spp. The palila (Loxioides bailleui), a Hawaiian honeycreeper, is restricted to this habitat type.

== Prehistoric dry forests ==
The forests' plant composition changed following the arrival of Polynesians, even excluding the deliberate introduction of non-native species. Fossilized pollen has shown that loulu forests with an understory of Ka palupalu o Kanaloa (Kanaloa kahoolawensis) and ʻaʻaliʻi (Dodonaea viscosa) existed on the islands' leeward lowlands from at least before 1210 B.C. until 1565 A.D. Populations of loulu and ʻaʻaliʻi remain in diminished form, while only two Ka palupalu o Kanaloa specimens have ever been seen in the wild.

== Maui ==
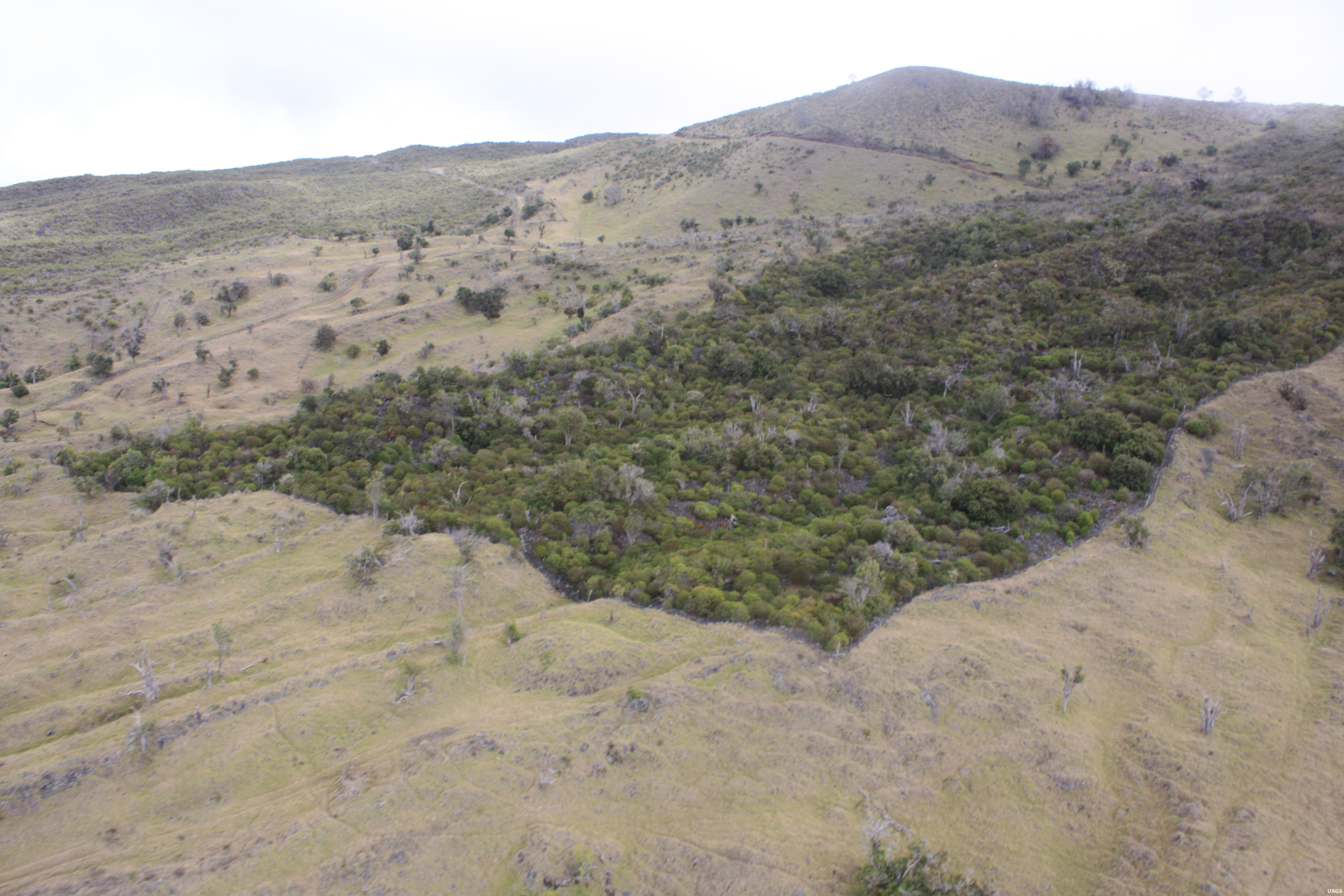
Auwahi Dryland Forest

The Auwahi Dryland Forest Restoration Project recreated a substantial forest with exclusively native species from invasive Kukui grasses on the slopes of Haleakala on the island of Maui.

== See also ==
- Oceanian realm
- Tropical and subtropical dry broadleaf forests
- Hawaiian tropical rainforests
- Hawaiian tropical low shrublands
- Hawaiian tropical high shrublands
- List of ecoregions in the United States (WWF)
