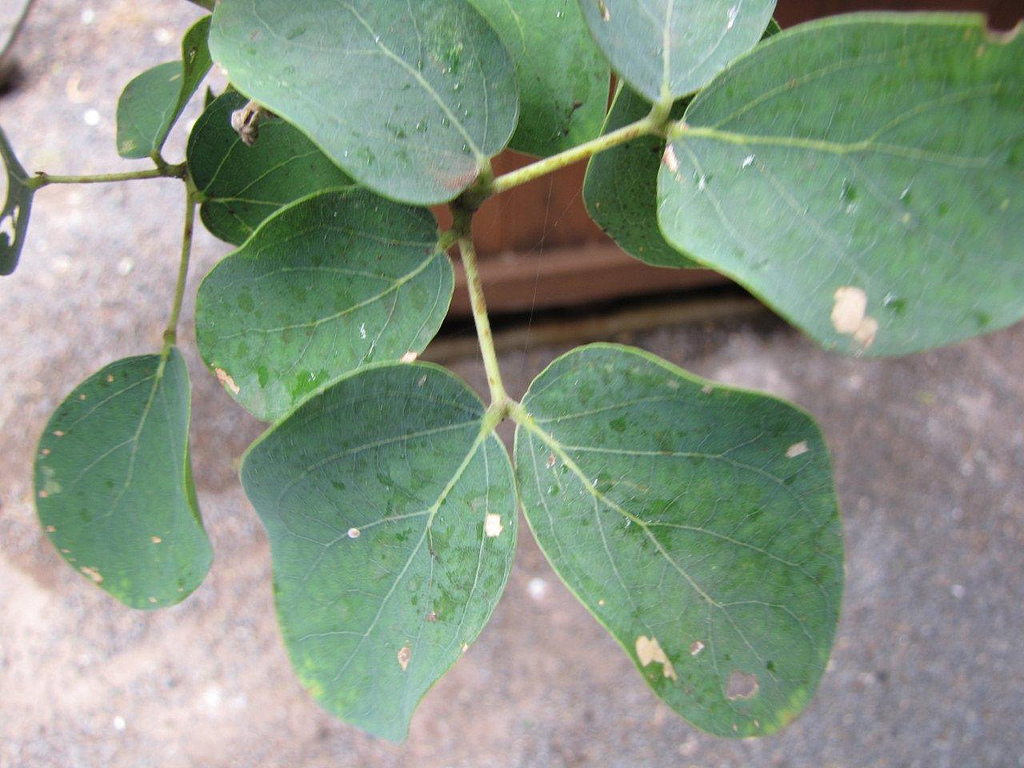

Conservation status
- Critically endangered, possibly extinct in the wild (IUCN 3.1)

Scientific classification
- Kingdom: Plantae
- Clade: Tracheophytes
- Clade: Angiosperms
- Clade: Eudicots
- Clade: Rosids
- Order: Fabales
- Family: Fabaceae
- Subfamily: Caesalpinioideae
- Clade: Mimosoid clade
- Genus: Kanaloa; Lorence & K.R.Wood
- Species: K. kahoolawensis

Binomial name
- Kanaloa kahoolawensis Lorence & K.R.Wood

= Kanaloa kahoolawensis =

Species of legume

Kanaloa kahoolawensis, the Ka palupalu o Kanaloa or kohe malama malama o kanaloa, is a species of flowering plant in the legume family, Fabaceae and is endemic to Hawaii. Kanaloa is a monotypic genus with the single species Kanaloa kahoolawensis.

== History ==
Kanaloa was discovered in 1992 by the botanists Ken Wood and Steve Perlman of the National Tropical Botanical Garden on Kahoʻolawe, a small island that was formerly used as a bombing range. Kahoʻolawe was a penal colony for the Hawaiian monarchy from 1826 to 1853, after which it was leased for ranching. Dry weather and ranching have devastated the island's vegetation. Only two wild plants of Kanaloa kahoolawensis have been observed growing on the island. The genus and species were formally named by Lorence and Wood in 1994. The genus name honors the Hawaiian deity Kanaloa, who according to legend used the island to rest and regain his energies. Scholars and native Hawaiian activists both agree that Kanaloa is from the original name "Kohemālamalama o Kanaloa", which translates as the place or womb for the resuscitation of Kanaloa. According to Lorence & Wood (1994), Kanaloa means, "secure, firm, immovable, established, unconquerable...Such attributes are certainly essential for this plant to have survived in spite of the severe degradation of the island". The specific epithet kahoolawensis is from the island Kahoʻolawe where the first species was discovered.

== Habitat and range ==
Only two plants have ever been found in the wild. The single remaining plant grows on the cliffs of Aleʻale Puʻuloae on a sea stack off the coast of the Kahoʻolawe. Soils are oxisols derived from basaltic lavas at an elevation of 45–60 m. It is possible that the range of this species previously included other Hawaiian islands; fossilized pollen from plants likely to be in the same genus has been found in core samples taken from sinkholes in Oʻahu's ʻEwa Plain, Maui, and Kauaʻi's Makauwahi Cave. Whether the pollen grains in the samples belong to K. kahoolawensis cannot be determined. As Kahoʻolawe was united with Maui and other islands prehistorically (see also Maui Nui), it is entirely possible that the pollen belongs to K. kahoolawensis. On the other hand, it may also be that the Oʻahu population remains represent another, extinct, species - possibly an ancestor of K. kahoolawensis -, judging from the biogeography of Hawaiian land plants.

== Description ==
Kanaloa kahoolawensis is an unarmed shrub reaching 0.75–1 m in height. Branches are dense, decumbent and measure 0.75-1.5 m long. New growth is densely brown hirtellous-villosulous with straight and curly, white and brown simple trichomes 0.1-0.3 mm long. Stipules free, paired, ovate, villosulous, 1.5–2 mm x 1.2-1.5 mm. Leaves alternate, bipinnately compound with one pair of pinnae, each pinna bears 3 leaflets, a terminal pair and a single proximal leaflet on the abaxial side, leaflets nearly sessile, pulvinus <1 mm, ovate to elliptic, asymmetrical, 2.7-4.2 cm x 1.4-3.2 cm, venation reticulate, leaflet margin entire. Tendrils absent. The inflorescence is a globose capitulum, 7.0-8.5 mm in diameter, peduncle 2.7-4.5 cm, flowers white, 20-54 per head, subtended by persistent peltate bracts, mostly unisexual, male, a few with very reduced sterile stigmas <0.5 mm, hermaphroditic flowers not seen. Sepals pubescent, connate, calyx obconic, 2-2.5 mm, 5 lobed. Petals 5, free, 2.0–3 mm, oblanceolate, inflexed, pubescent, extremely hirtellous apically, midvein conspicuous. Stamens 10, distinct, anthers dorsifixed 0.6-1.0 mm, filaments 2-4.5 mm. Pollen in monads, tricolporate. Fruits stipitate, stipe 4–5 mm long, as many as 4 per capitulum, inertly dehiscent along both margins, obovate or subcircular, 2.4-3.2 x 2-2.3 cm. Each fruit contains a single seed

== Phylogeny ==
- Leucaena group
  - - Schleinitzia
    - - Kanaloa
      - Desmanthus
  - Leucaena

Phylogenetic tree of Leucaena group

Based on molecular phylogenetic studies, Kanaloa is closely related to Schleinitzia and Desmanthus. Shared features include: lack of spines or prickles, presence of sessile petiolar glands, petals free to the base, and inflorescence a capitulum. Kanaloa differs from Schleinitzia in lacking glands at the apex of the anthers and having simple rather than compound pollen grains. Fruits are dehiscent along the sutures in Kanaloa; in Schleinitzia the sutural ribs separate from the valves forming a craspedium similar to that in Mimosa. Kanaloa is most closely related to Desmanthus, sharing peltate floral bracts and inertly dehiscent fruits. Kanaloa differs from Desmanthus in having 3 leaflets per pinna and cordiform seeds.

== Conservation ==
Other than preserving the wild plants, efforts have been put into establishing ex-situ stocks (in a nursery or arboretum), and increasing plant populations with a minimum of 25 individuals. Fences have been built to protect the single wild plant from grazing and trampling by introduced mammals. The plants are inspected regularly for insect damage and disease. Another plant that was grown from seed is currently kept in the National Tropical Botanical Garden’s McBryde Garden on Kauaʻi, Hawaii.
