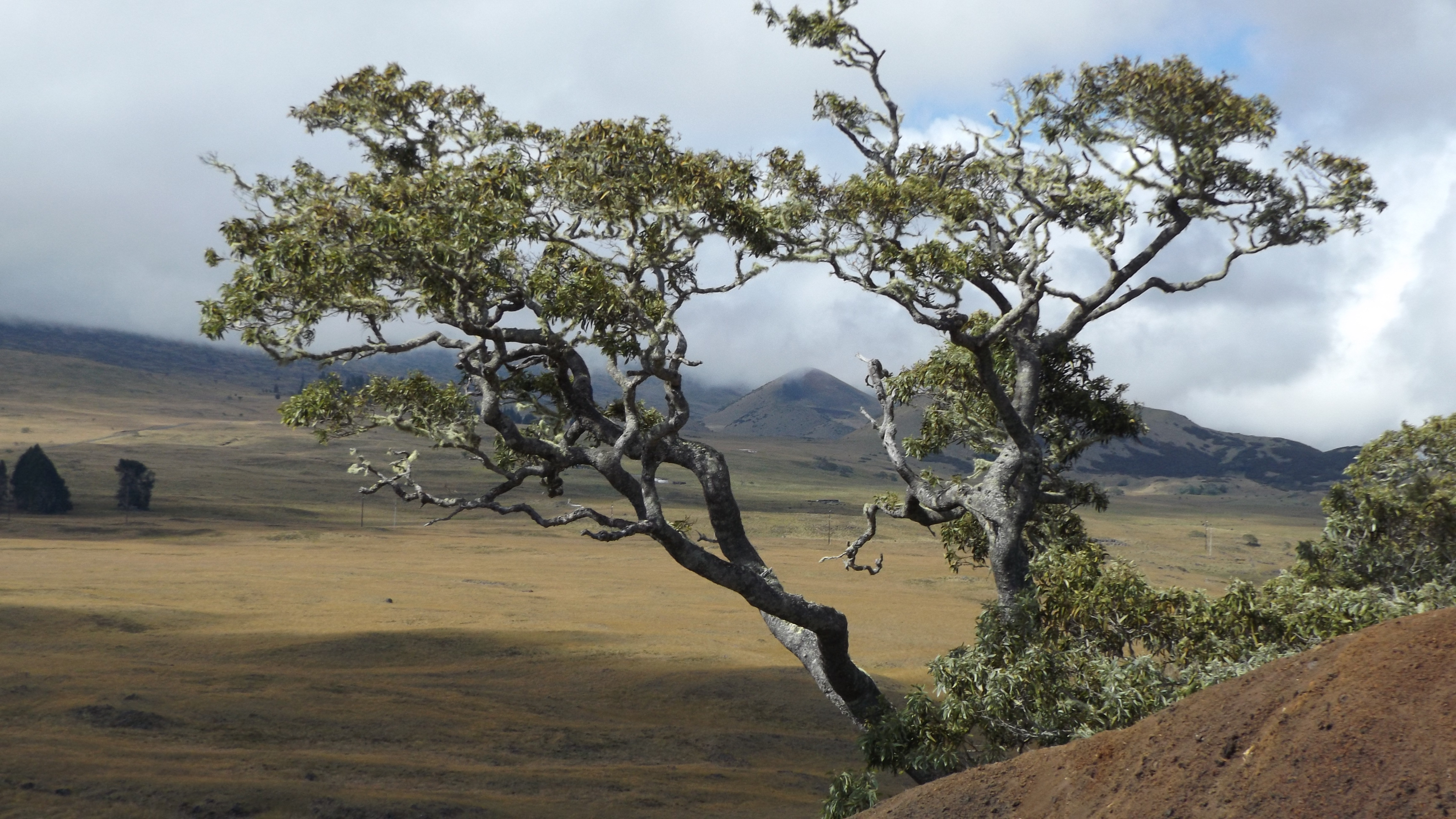
- Mature Acacia koa in Hawaii.

Conservation status
- Least Concern (IUCN 3.1)

Scientific classification
- Kingdom: Plantae
- Clade: Tracheophytes
- Clade: Angiosperms
- Clade: Eudicots
- Clade: Rosids
- Order: Fabales
- Family: Fabaceae
- Subfamily: Caesalpinioideae
- Clade: Mimosoid clade
- Genus: Acacia
- Species: A. koa

Binomial name
- Acacia koa A.Gray

Synonyms
- Acacia heterophylla var. latifolia Benth. Acacia kauaiensis Hillebr. Racosperma koa (A.Gray) Pedley

= Acacia koa =

Species of flowering tree endemic to the Hawaiian Islands

Acacia koa, commonly known as koa, is a species of flowering tree in the family Fabaceae. It is endemic to the Hawaiian Islands, where it is the second most common tree. The highest populations are on Hawaiʻi, Maui and Oʻahu.

== Name ==
The name koa in the Hawaiian language ultimately comes from Proto-Austronesian *teRas meaning "core" or "ironwood"; many names referring to certain ironwood or heartwood species in Southeast Asia and Oceania such as Vitex parviflora (tugás in Cebuano), Eusideroxylon zwageri (togas in Tombonuwo), and Intsia bijuga (dort in Palauan) descend from this root. The Hawaiian Acacia koa is closely related to a common tree in Taiwan called Acacia confusa. The two species also share a very similar appearance.

Koa also means brave, bold, fearless, or warrior.

== Description ==
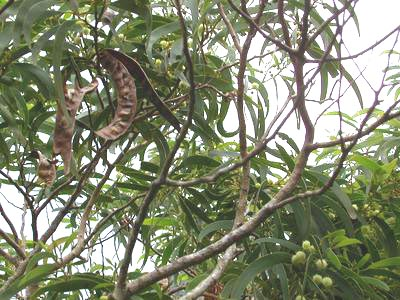
Upper branches of a koa tree, showing the bark, sickle-shaped phyllodes, greenish rounded flower heads, and seedpods

Koa is a large tree, typically attaining a height of 15–25 metres (49–82 feet) and a spread of 6–12 m (20–39 ft). In deep volcanic ash, a koa tree can reach a height of 30 m (98 ft), a circumference of 6 m (20 ft), and a spread of 38 m (125 ft). It is one of the fastest-growing Hawaiian trees, capable of reaching 6–9 m (20–30 ft) in five years on a good site.

=== Leaves ===
Initially, bipinnately compound leaves with 12–24 pairs of leaflets grow on the koa plant, much like other members of the pea family. At about 6–9 months of age, however, thick sickle-shaped "leaves" that are not compound begin to grow. These are phyllodes, blades that develop as an expansion of the leaf petiole. The vertically flattened orientation of the phyllodes allows sunlight to pass to lower levels of the tree. True leaves are entirely replaced by 7–25 cm (2.8–9.8 in) long, 0.5–2.5 cm (0.20–0.98 in) wide phyllodes on an adult tree.

=== Flowers ===
Flowers of the koa tree are pale-yellow spherical racemes with a diameter of 8–10 mm (0.31–0.39 in). Flowering may be seasonal or year round depending on the location.

=== Fruit ===
Fruit production start occurring when a koa tree is between 5 and 30 years old. The fruit are legumes, also called pods, with a length of 7.5–15 cm (3.0–5.9 in) and a width of 1.5–2.5 cm (0.59–0.98 in). Each pod contains an average of 12 seeds. The 6–12 mm (0.24–0.47 in) long, 4–7 mm (0.16–0.28 in) wide seeds are flattened ellipsoids and range from dark brown to black in color. The pods are mature and ready for propagation after turning from green to brown or black. Seeds are covered with a hard seed coat, and this allows them to remain dormant for up to 25 years. Scarification is needed before A. koa seeds will germinate.

=== Habitat ===
Koa is endemic to the islands of Hawaiʻi, Molokaʻi, Maui, Lānaʻi, Oʻahu, and Kauaʻi, where it grows at elevations of 100–2,300 m (330–7,550 ft). It requires 850–5,000 mm (33–197 in) of annual rainfall. Acidic to neutral soils (pH of 4–7.4) that are either an Inceptisol derived from volcanic ash or a well-drained histosol are preferred. Its ability to fix nitrogen allows it to grow in very young volcanic soils. Koa and ʻōhiʻa lehua (Metrosideros polymorpha) dominate the canopy of Hawaiian mixed mesic forests. It is also common in wet forests.

== Uses ==
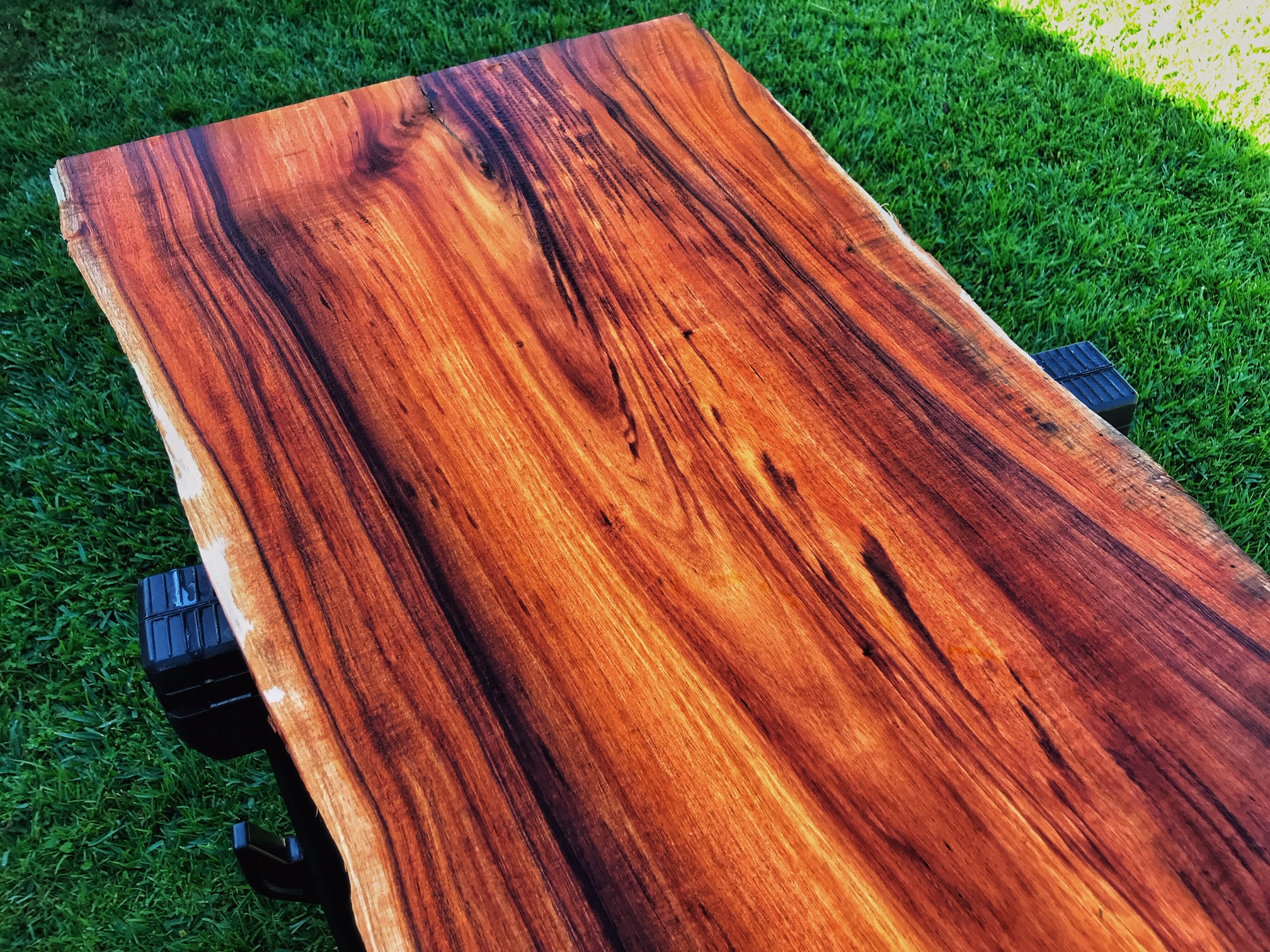
A thinly sliced section of wide Hawaiian Koa lumber

The koa's trunk was used by ancient Hawaiians to build waʻa (dugout outrigger canoes) and papa heʻe nalu (surfboards). Only paipo (bodyboards), kikoʻo, and alaia surfboards were made from koa, however; olo, the longest surfboards, were made from the lighter and more buoyant wiliwili (Erythrina sandwicensis). The reddish wood is very similar in strength and weight to that of black walnut (Juglans nigra), with a specific gravity of 0.55, and is now sought for use in wood carving and furniture. Koa is also a tonewood, often used in the construction of ukuleles, acoustic guitars, and Weissenborn-style Hawaiian steel guitars.

B.C. Rich used koa on some of their electric guitars as well, and still uses a koa-veneered topwood on certain models. Fender made limited edition koa wood models of the Telecaster and the Stratocaster in 2006. Trey Anastasio, guitarist for the band Phish, primarily uses a koa hollowbody Languedoc guitar. Commercial silviculture of koa takes 20 to 25 years before a tree is of useful size.

Taylor, Collings and Martin are few among the many other brands that use that tonewood for manufacturing acoustic guitars.

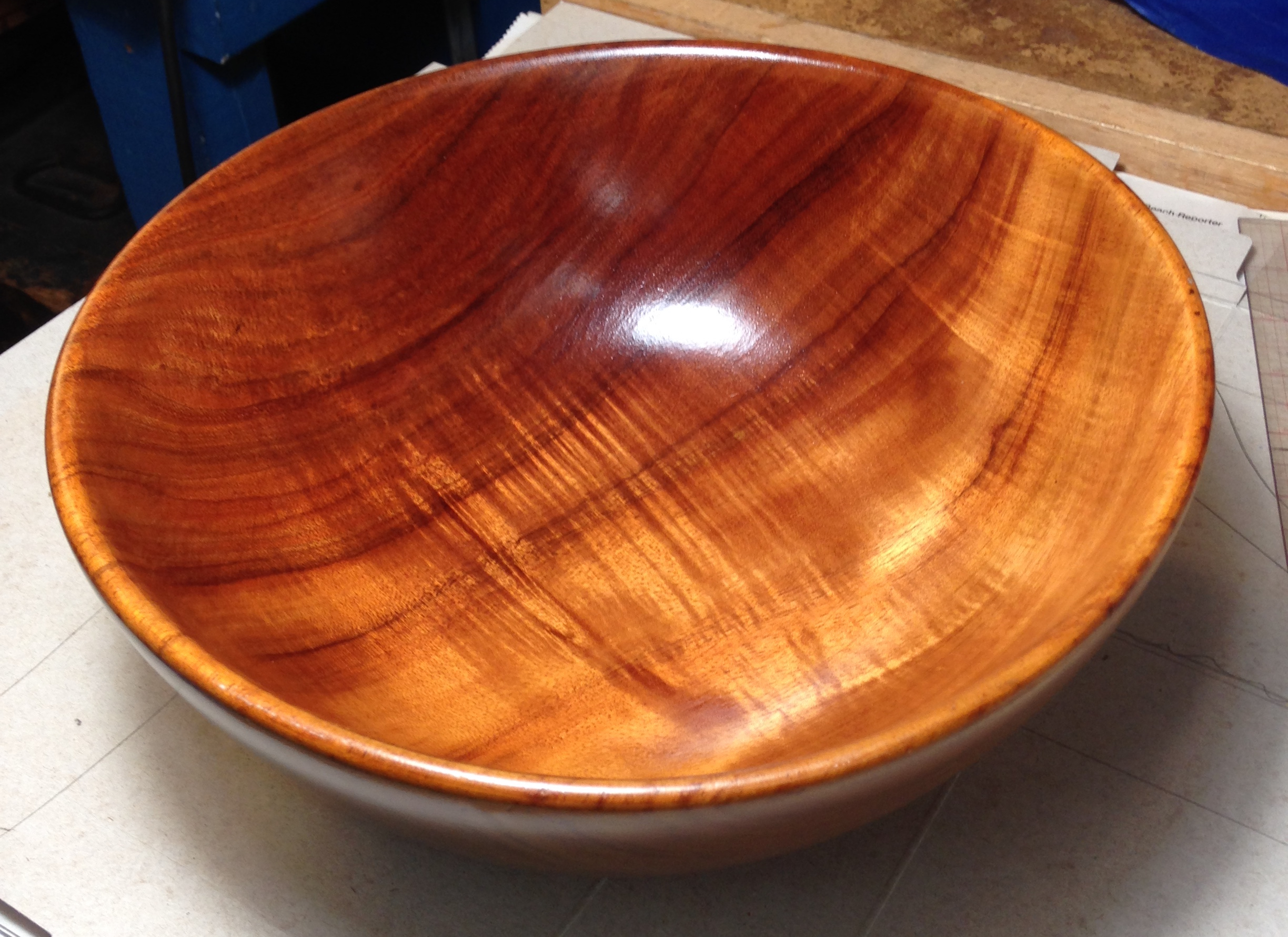
‛Umeke Lū‛au Pākākā (Hawaiian: "low, broad feast bowl") hand-turned from Koa by master woodworker Millard Blair (1914–1995), owner of Blair's at Waikiki (1945–1986).

In Hawaiʻi, the ‛umeke (Hawaiian: “wooden bowl”) has been a highly perfected art form and considered a prized possession for well over a thousand years. They were expertly handcrafted using rare and exotic hardwoods like Kou, Milo, and Koa. Prior to 1819, ‛umekes were considered sacred and strictly reserved for ‛Ali‛i (Hawaiian: “Royalty”), and under penalty of death for a commoner to possess one. Today, ‛umekes are highly collectible and have become known as a universal symbol of generosity and welcome.

The timber provides very high chatoyancy, with an average value above 26 PZC.

== Relation to other species ==
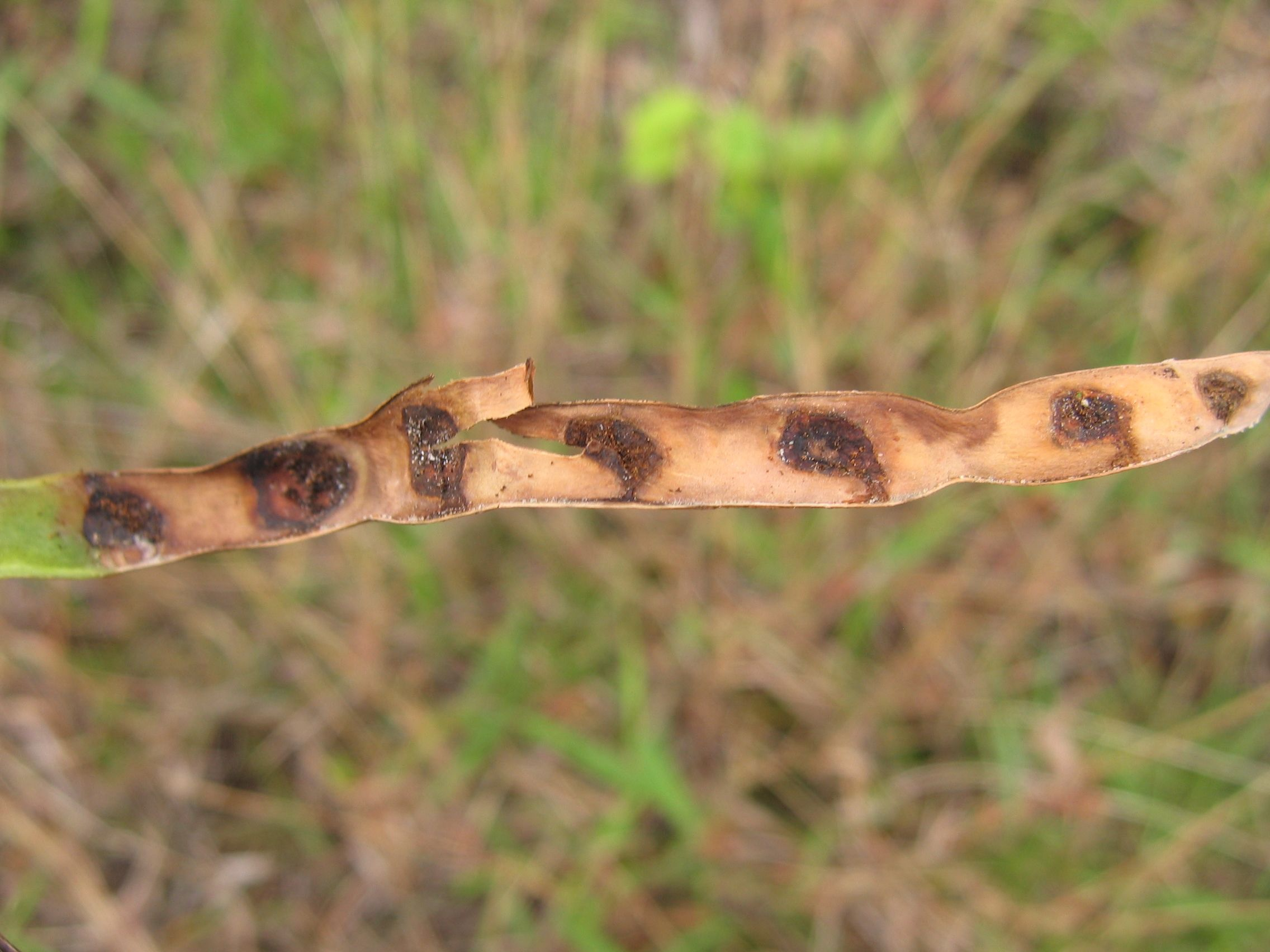
Koaiʻa seedpod, showing the end-to-end arrangement of seeds

Among other Pacific Islands of volcanic (non-continental) origin, only Vanuatu has native Acacia species. A. heterophylla, from distant Réunion, is very similar and has been suggested to be the closest relative of koa. Genetic sequence analysis results announced in 2014 confirmed this close relationship; the estimated time of divergence is about 1.4 million years ago. A. heterophylla sequences nest within those of the more diverse A. koa, making the latter paraphyletic. Both species are thought to be descended from an ancestral species in Australia, presumably their sister species, Acacia melanoxylon. Dispersals most likely occurred via seed-carrying by birds such as petrels. Both species have very similar ecological niches, which differ from that of A. melanoxylon.

A closely related species, koaiʻa or koaiʻe (A. koaia), is found in dry areas. It is most easily distinguished by having smaller seeds that are arranged end-to-end in the pod, rather than side by side. The phyllodes are also usually straighter, though this character is variable in both species. The wood is denser, harder, and more finely grained than koa wood. Koaiʻa has been much more heavily impacted by cattle and is now rare, but can be seen on ranch land in North Kohala.

== Conservation ==
The koa population has suffered from grazing and logging. Many wet forest areas, where the largest koa grow, have been logged out, and it now comes largely from dead or dying trees or farms on private lands. Although formerly used for outrigger canoes, there are few koa remaining which are both large and straight enough to do so today. In areas where cattle are present, koa regeneration is almost completely suppressed. However, if the cattle are removed, koa are among the few native Hawaiian plants able to germinate in grassland, and can be instrumental in restoring native forest. It is often possible to begin reforestation in a pasture by disk harrowing the soil, as this scarifies seeds in the soil and encourages large numbers of koa to germinate. Experiments at the Hakalau Forest National Wildlife Refuge have shown that ʻōhiʻa lehua (Metrosideros polymorpha) survives best in pasture when planted under koa. This is because koa trees reduce radiative cooling, preventing frost damage to ʻōhiʻa lehua seedlings.

== Ecology ==
Koa is the preferred host plant for the caterpillars of the green Hawaiian blue (Udara blackburni), which eat the flowers and fruits. Adults drink nectar from the flowers. Koa sap is eaten by the adult Kamehameha butterfly (Vanessa tameamea). The koa bug (Coleotichus blackburniae) uses its rostrum to suck the contents out of koa seeds. Koa is vulnerable to infection by koa wilt.

== Gallery ==
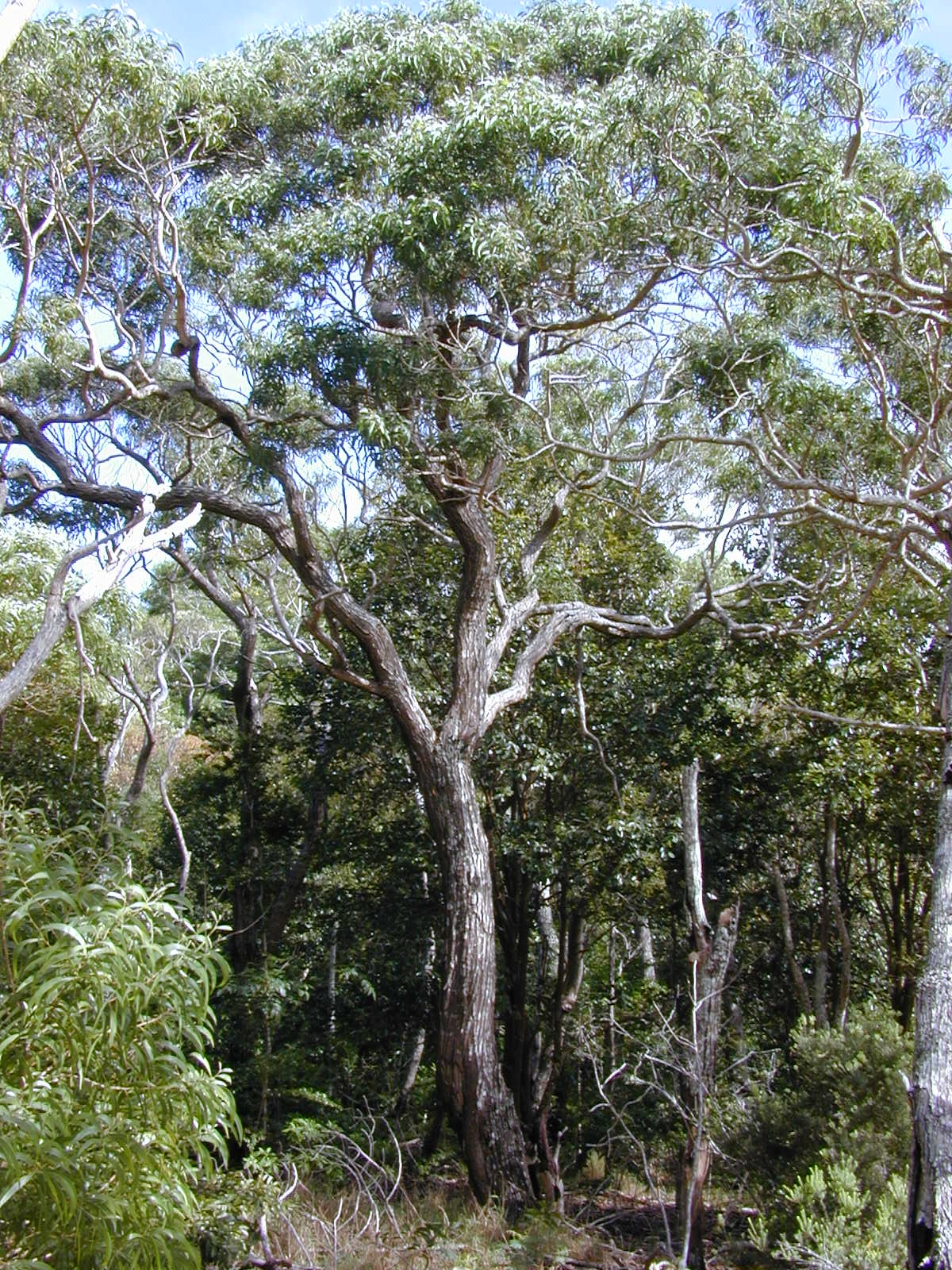
A mature specimen

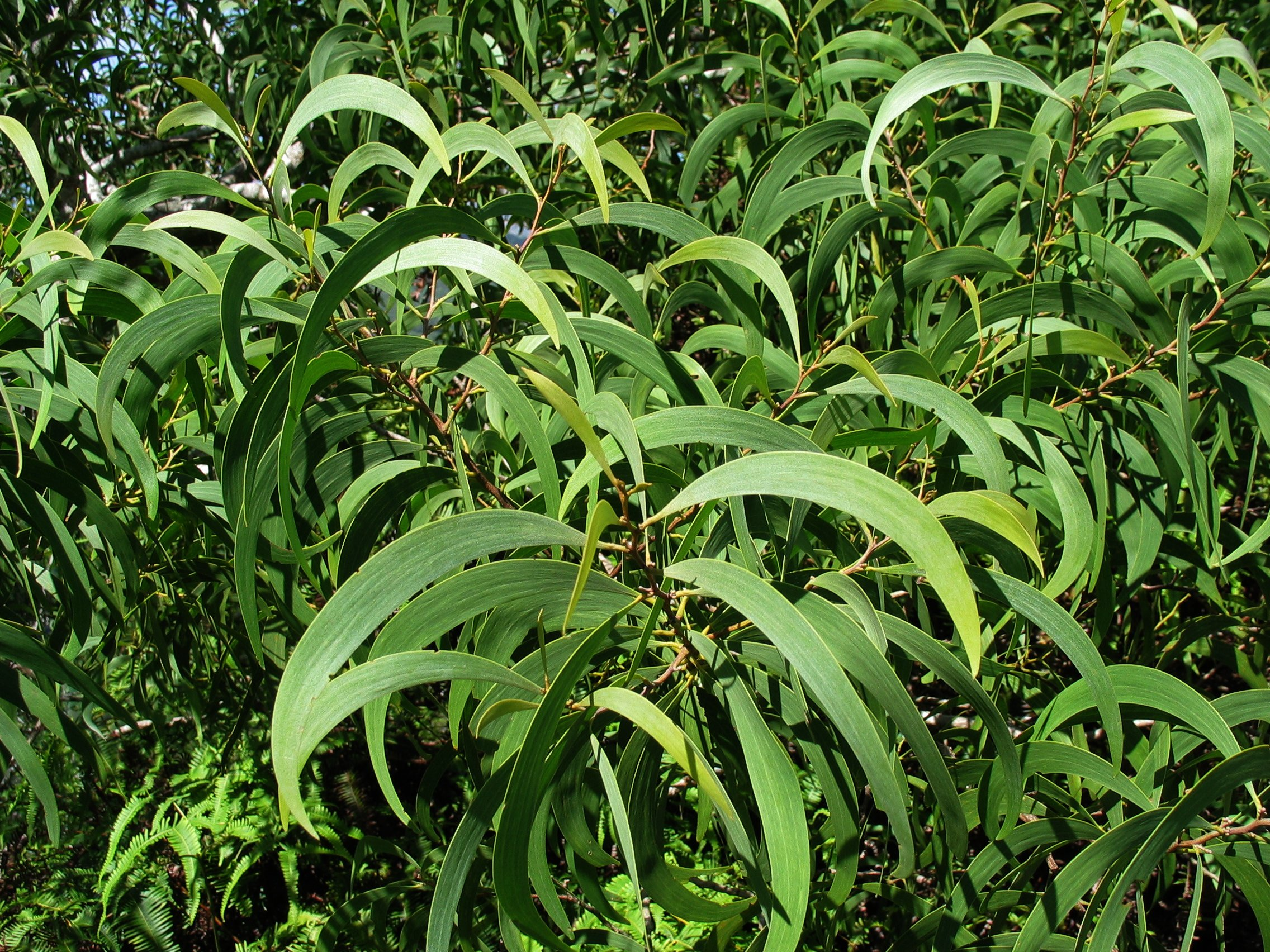
Detail of mature phyllodes

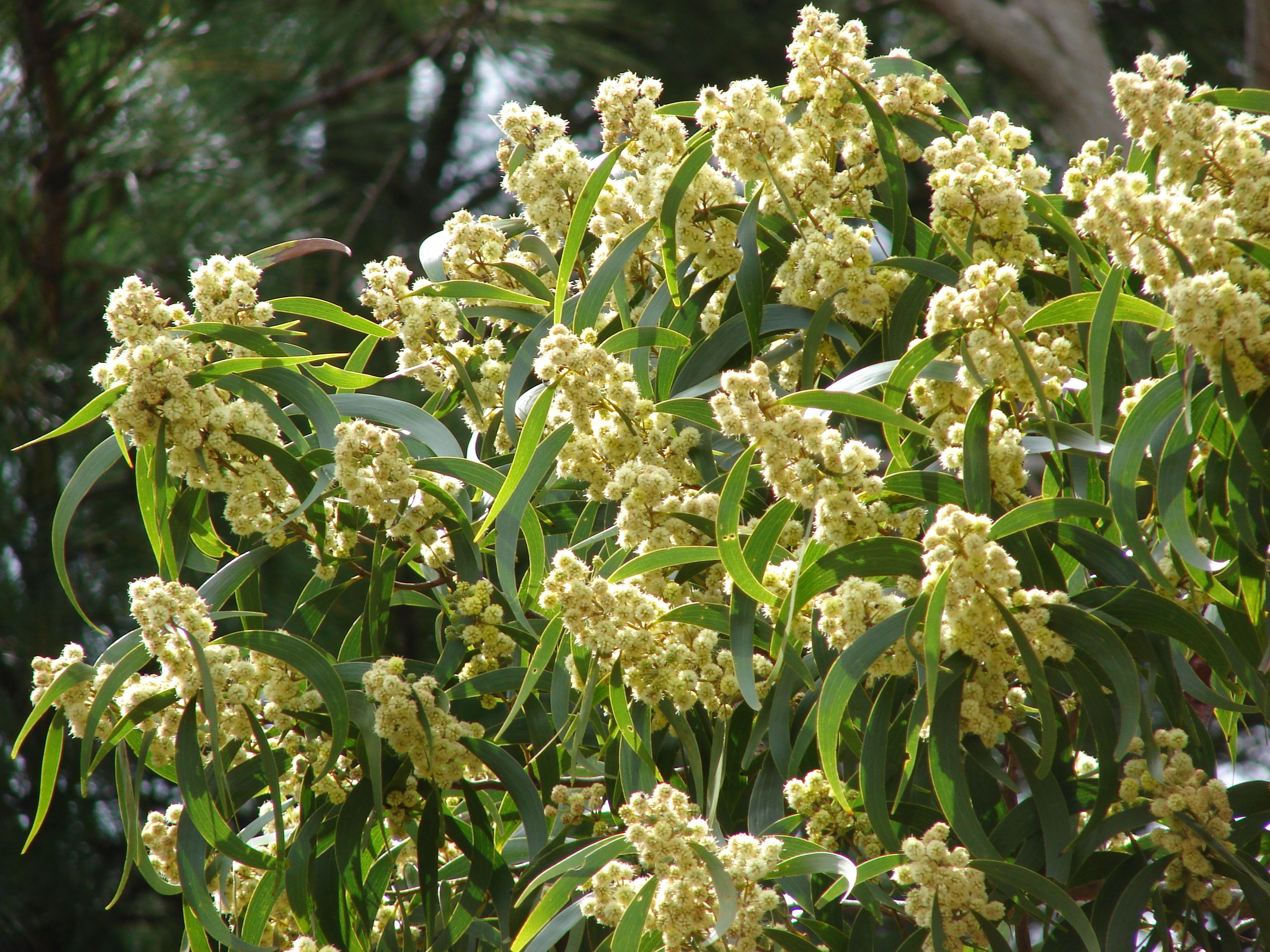
The flowers

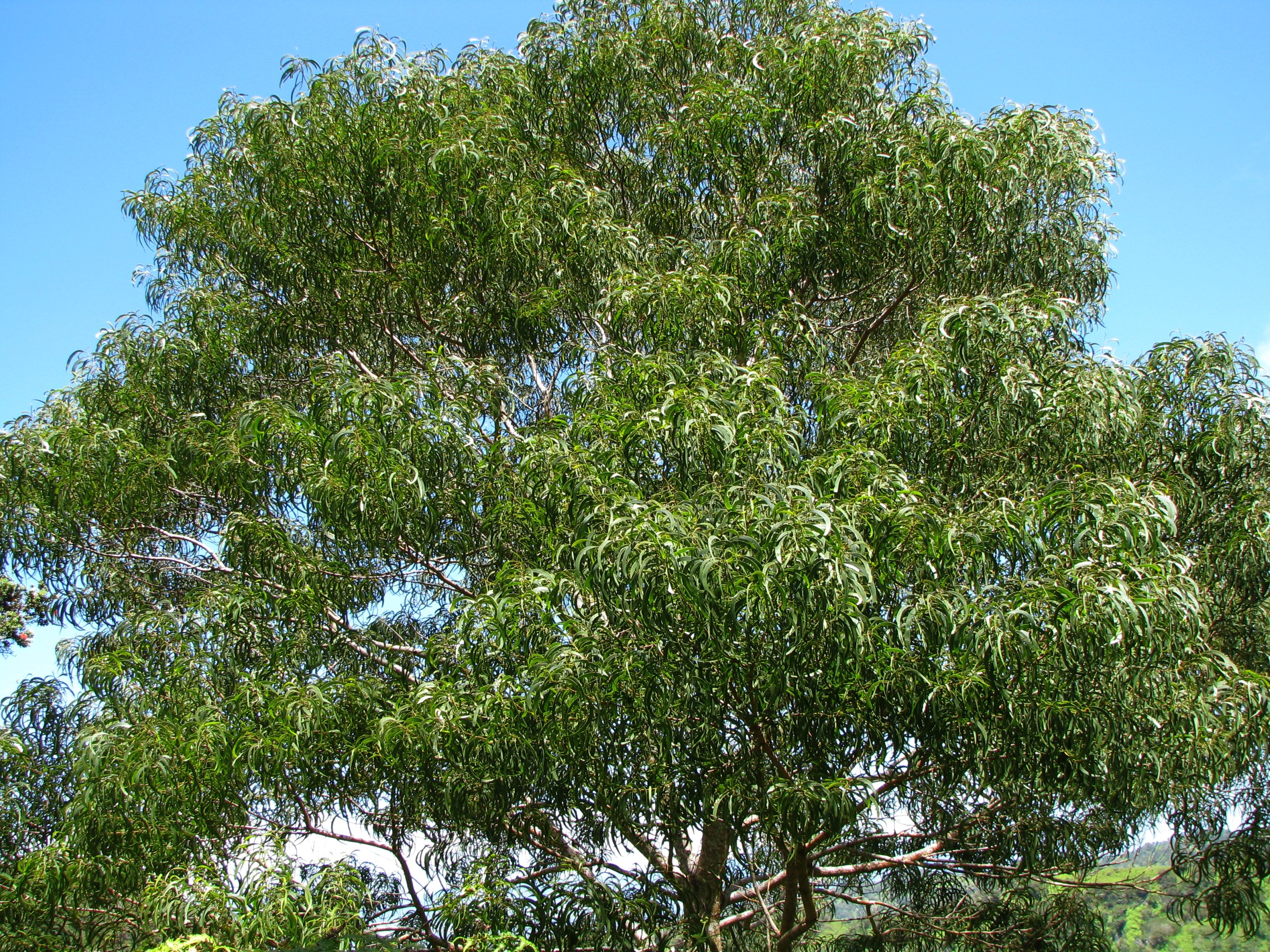
The canopy

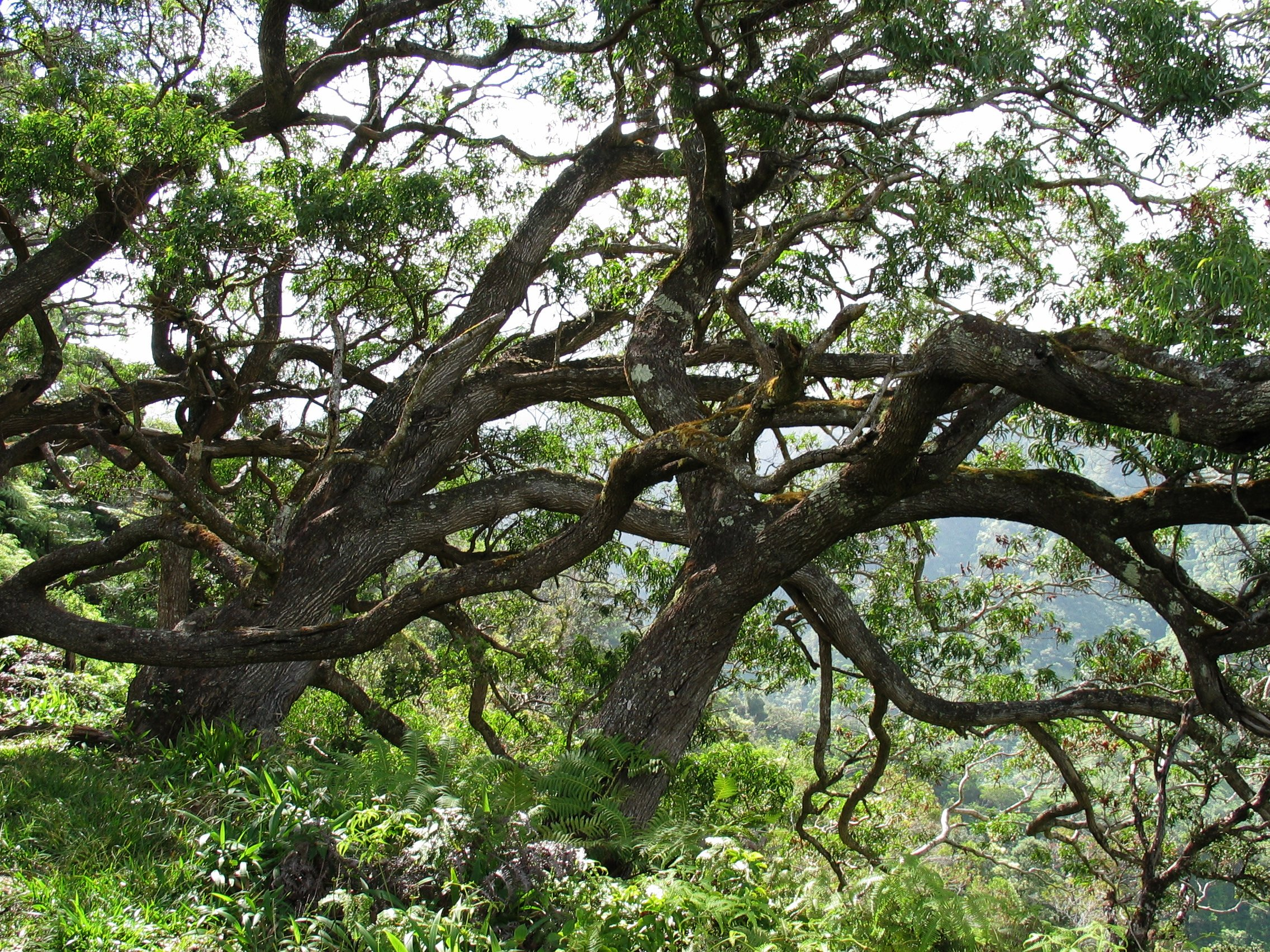
Trunk and bark

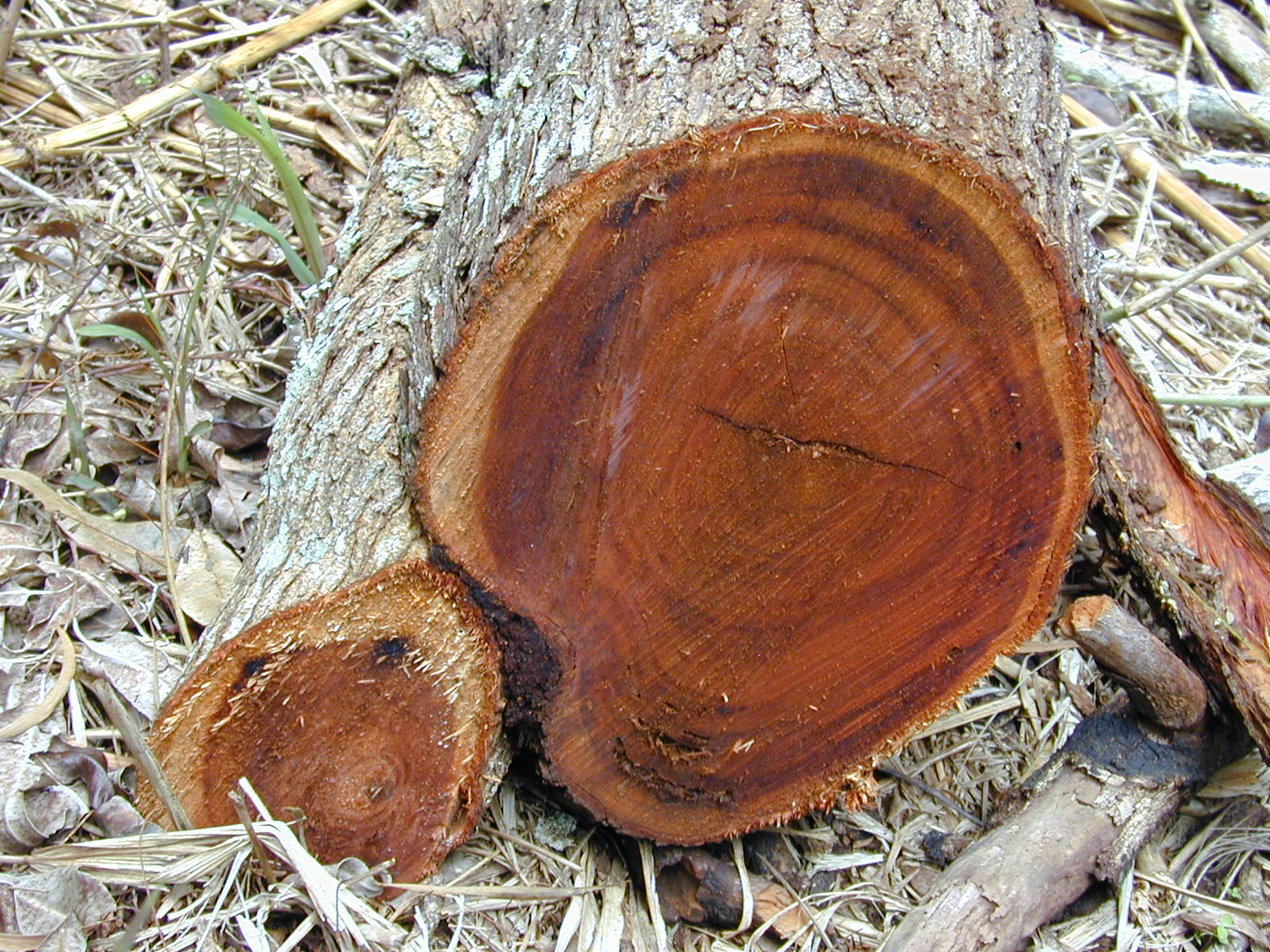
Detail of the wood

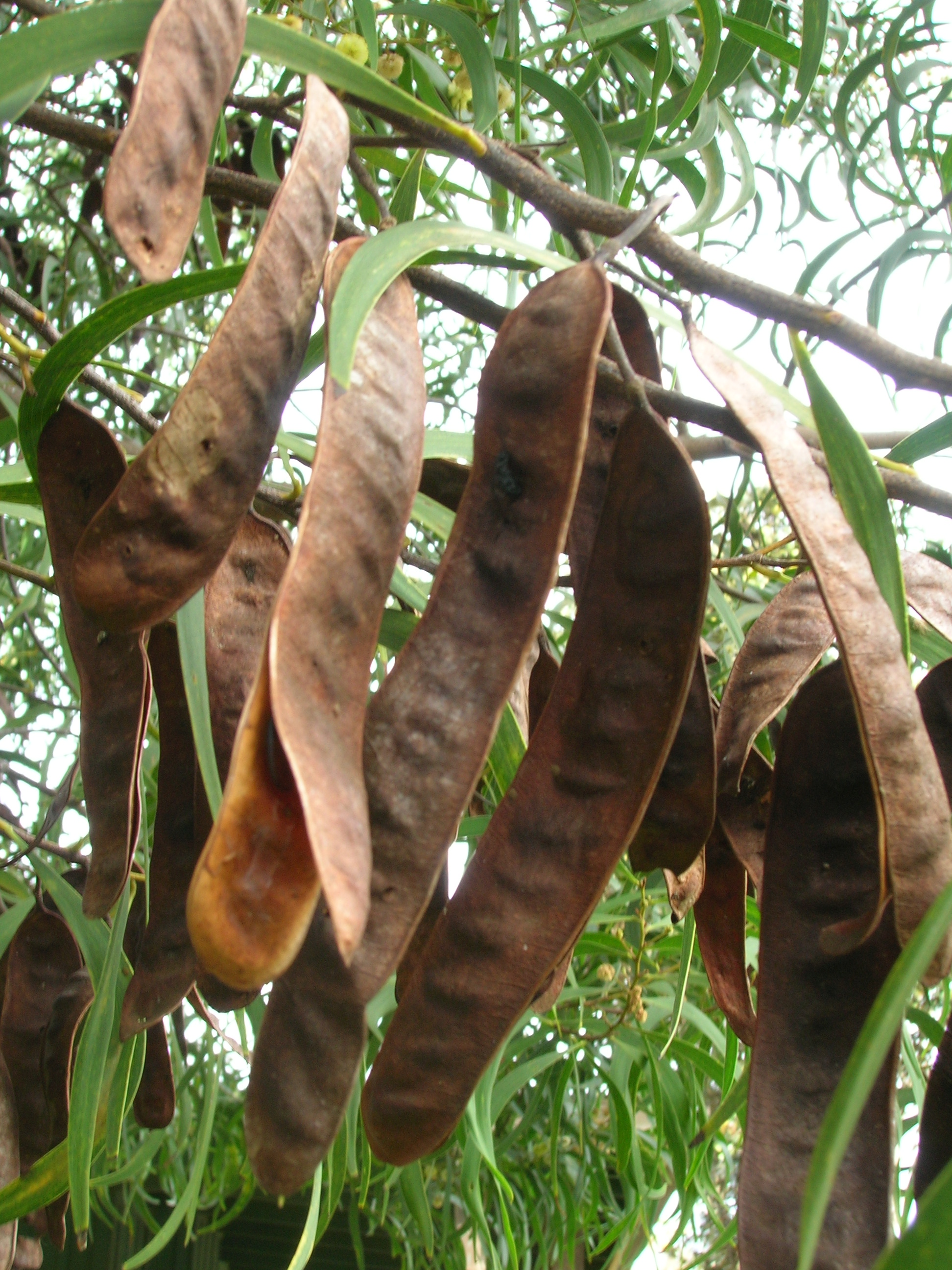
The seed pods

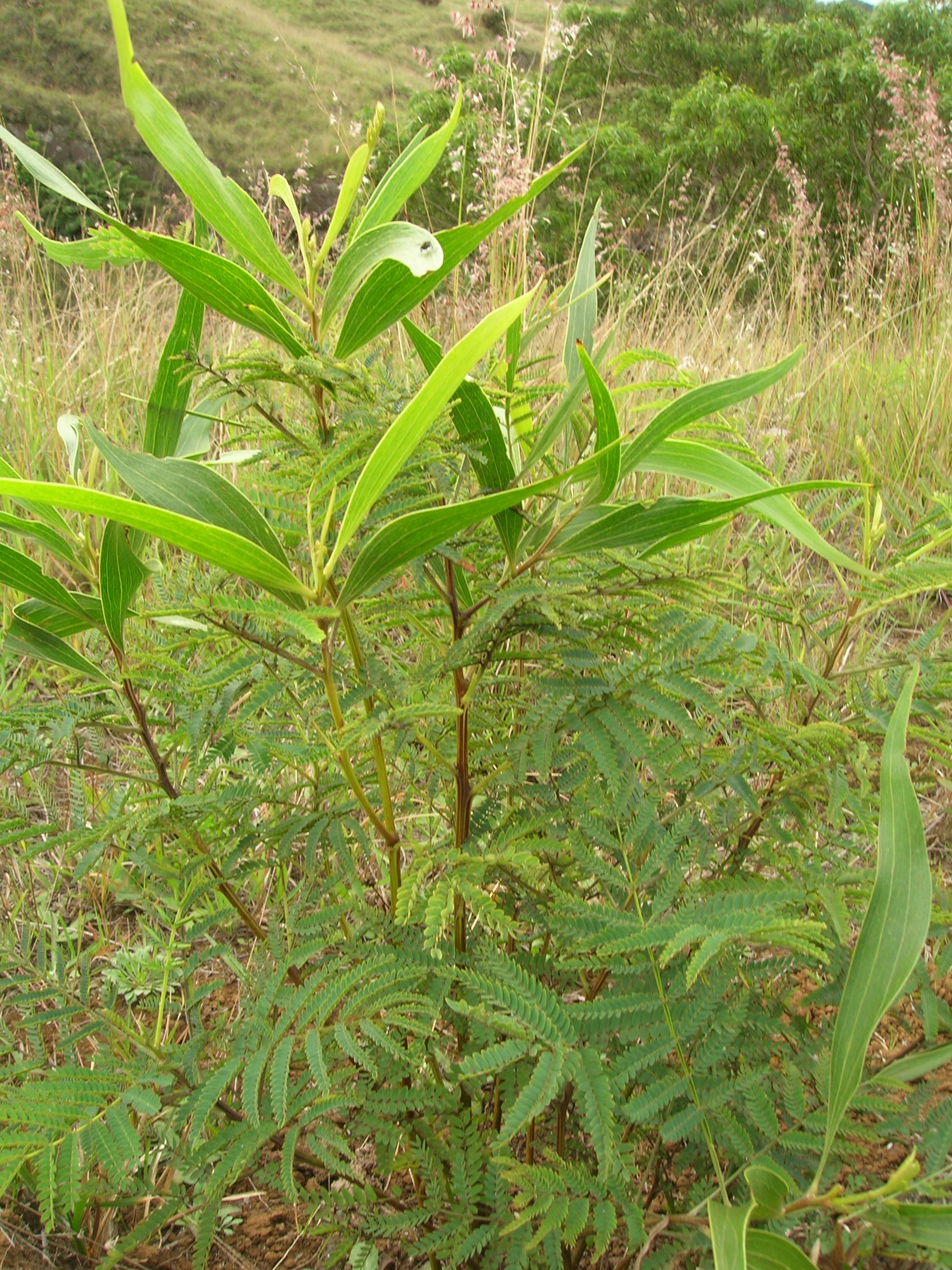
Acacia koa seedling with phyllodes and compound leaves
