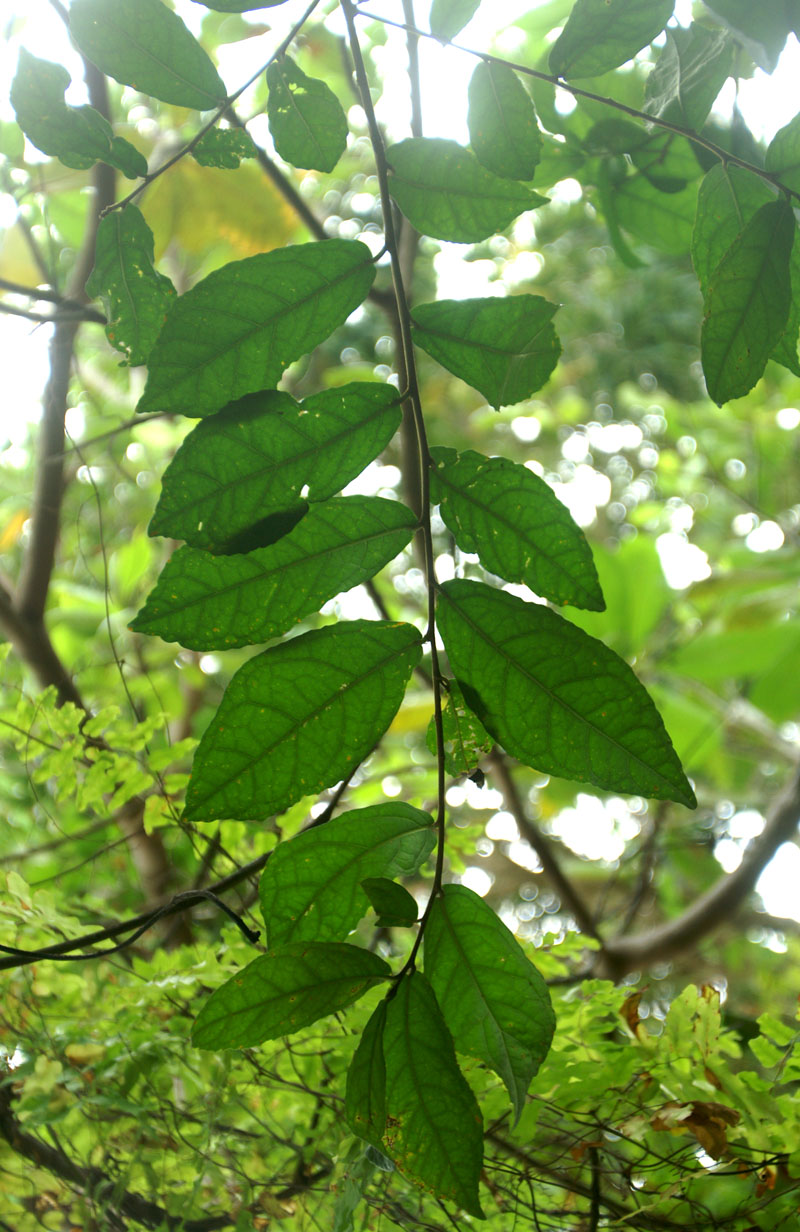
- Streblus asper

Scientific classification
- Kingdom: Plantae
- Clade: Tracheophytes
- Clade: Angiosperms
- Clade: Eudicots
- Clade: Rosids
- Order: Rosales
- Family: Moraceae
- Tribe: Moreae
- Genus: Streblus; Lour. (1790)

Species
- See text

Synonyms
- Achimus Poir. (1806); Achymus Vahl ex Juss. (1816); Albrandia Gaudich. (1830); Calius Blanco (1837); Diplocos Bureau (1873); Diplothorax Gagnep. (1928); Epicarpurus Blume (1826); Pachytrophe Bureau (1873)

= Streblus =

Genus of flowering plants

Streblus is a genus of flowering plants in the mulberry family, Moraceae. It includes five species native to the Indian subcontinent, Indochina, southern China, and Malesia.

== Species ==
Five species are currently accepted.

- Streblus asper Lour. – Siamese rough bush
- Streblus celebensis C.C.Berg
- Streblus mitis Kurz
- Streblus vidalii T.H.Nguyên
- Streblus monoicus Gagnep.

=== Formerly placed here ===
- Paratrophis banksii Cheeseman – large-leaved milk tree (as Streblus banksii (Cheeseman) C.J.Webb)
- Paratrophis microphylla (Raoul) Cockayne – small-leaved milk tree (as Streblus heterophyllus (Blume) Corner)
- Paratrophis pendulina (Endl.) E.M.Gardner – aʻiaʻi (Eastern Australia, Melanesia, Micronesia, Polynesia) (as Streblus pendulinus (Endl.) F.Muell and Streblus brunonianus (Endl.) F.Muell.)
- Paratrophis sclerophylla (Corner) E.M.Gardner (as Streblus sclerophyllus Corner)
- Paratrophis smithii Cheeseman – Three Kings milk tree (as Streblus smithii (Cheeseman) Corner)
- Sloetia elongata (Miq.) Koord. (as Streblus elongatus (Miq.) Corner)
- Taxotrophis ilicifolia (Kurz) S.Vidal (as Streblus ilicifolius (Vidal) Corner)
- Taxotrophis taxoides (B.Heyne ex Roth) Chew ex E.M.Gardner (as Streblus taxoides (Roth) Kurz.)
