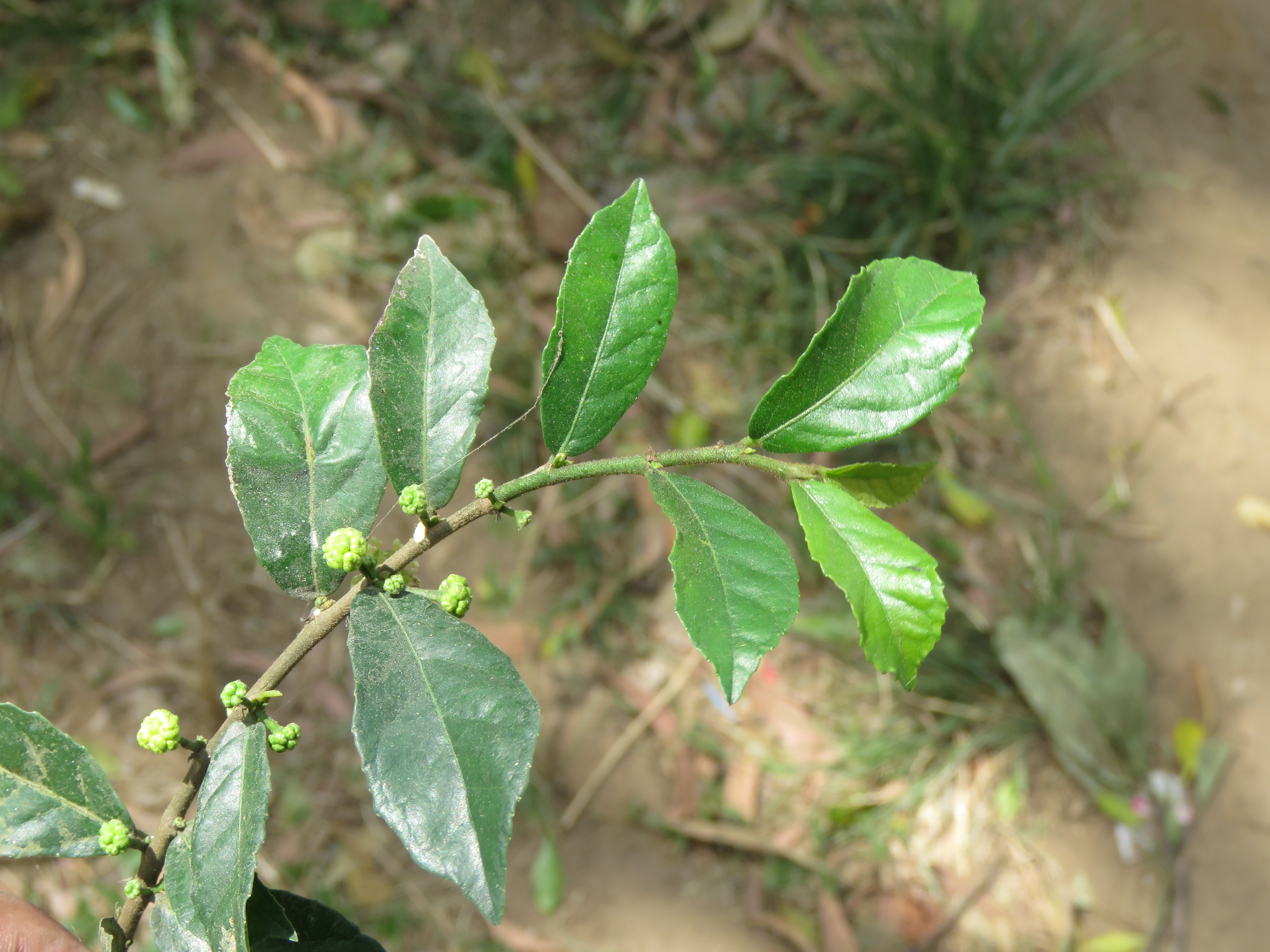
- Leaves and buds at Panamaram

Conservation status
- Least Concern (IUCN 3.1)

Scientific classification
- Kingdom: Plantae
- Clade: Tracheophytes
- Clade: Angiosperms
- Clade: Eudicots
- Clade: Rosids
- Order: Rosales
- Family: Moraceae
- Genus: Streblus
- Species: S. asper

Binomial name
- Streblus asper Lour.

Synonyms
- List: Epicarpurus asper (Lour.) Steud.; Achymus pallens Sol. ex Blume; Achymus patens Sol. ex Hook.f.; Albrandia gaudichaudii D.Dietr.; Albrandia orientalis D.Dietr.; Albrandia timorensis D.Dietr.; Calius lactescens Blanco; Cudrania crenata C.H.Wright; Diplothorax tonkinensis Gagnep.; Epicarpurus gaudichaudii Steud.; Epicarpurus orientalis Blume; Morus indica Ser.; Morus tatarica Mill.; Streblus lactescens Blume; Trophis aspera Retz.; Trophis cochinchinensis Poir.; Vanieria crenata (C.H.Wright) Chun

= Streblus asper =

Species of tree

Streblus asper is a species of flowering plant in the family Moraceae. This tree is sometimes referred to by the common names Siamese rough bush, khoi, serut, and toothbrush tree. It is a medium-sized tree native to dry regions in the Andaman Islands, Assam, Bangladesh, Cambodia, South-Central and Southeast China, East and West Himalaya, Hainan, India, Indonesia, Java, Laos, the Lesser Sunda Islands, Malaysia, Myanmar, Nepal, the Nicobar Islands, Pakistan, the Philippines, Sri Lanka, Sumatra, Thailand, and Vietnam.

In the Philippines, it is commonly known as "bogta-e","bogtalay", and "Kalyos". In Cambodia, it is known as Snay. Several rural communes in Cambodia were named after the tree such as Snay Pol village (Poisonous Snay) of Prey Veng and Krang Snay (Hill of Snay) of Kampot Province. In Malaysia, it is known as "kesinai".

== Description ==
The leaves are approximately 5–10 centimetres (2–4 inches) long, rigid, oval-shaped, irregularly toothed, and borne on small petioles. Staminate flower heads are spherical with minute flowers; pistillate flowers have longer peduncles.

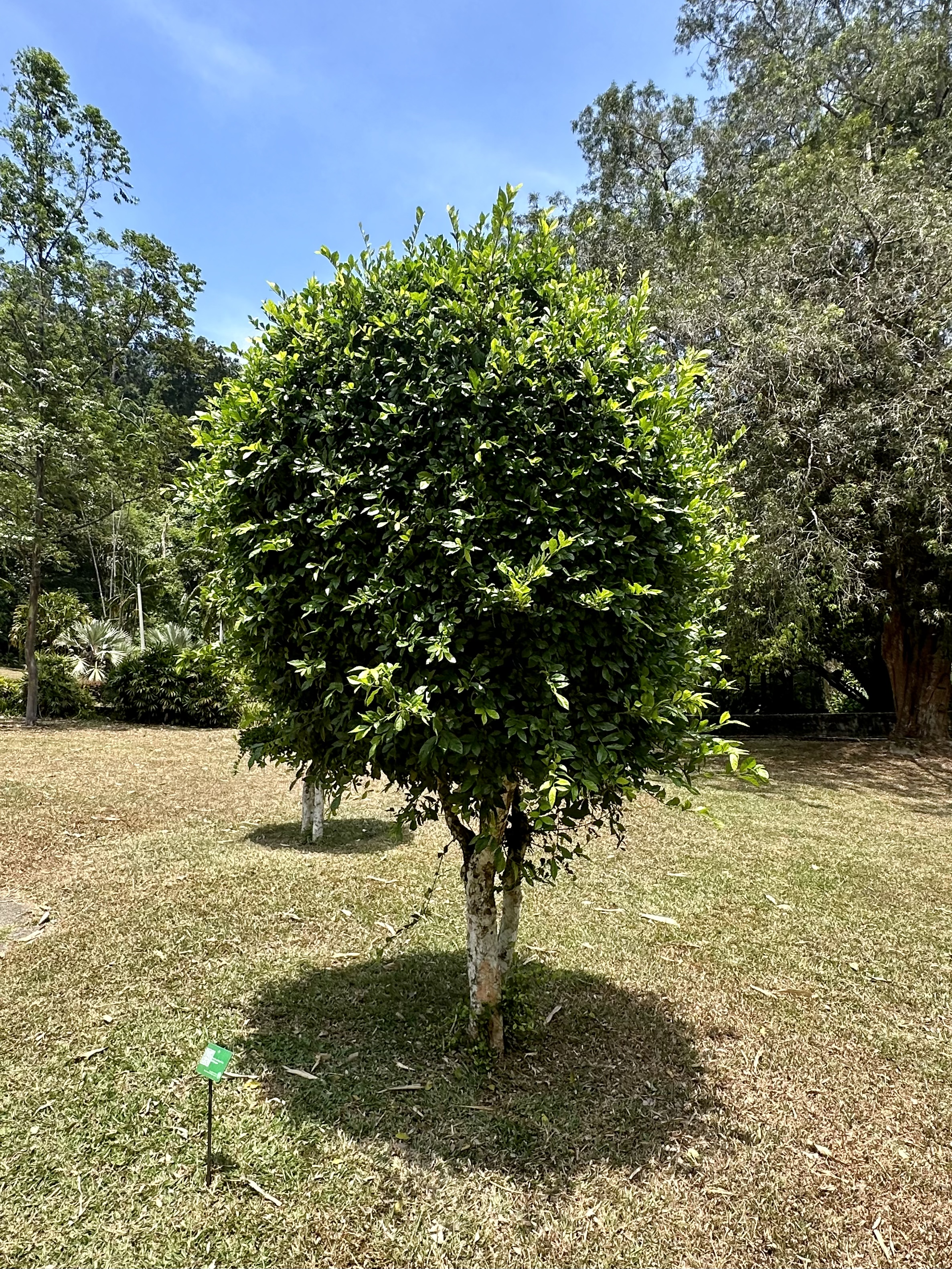
Streblus asper in the Penang Botanical Garden

== Common Names ==
- English: Sand Paper Tree, Siamese rough bush, Toothbrush tree
- Hindi: Daheyā/Dahiā (दहेया/दहिया), Karchannā (करचन्ना), Rusa (रुसा), Sahorā/Sihorā (सहोरा/सिहोरा)
- Marathi: Poi (पोइ), Karerā (करेरा), Kharoli/Kharota ()
- Rajasthani: Piḷuṛi (पिळूड़ी)
- Indonesian: Serut
- Tamil: Kurripila (குர்ரிபிலா), Kuṭṭippirai (குட்டிப்பிறை), Parayan (பறையன்), Pasunā (பசுனா)
- Malayalam: Parakam (പരകം), Paruva (പരുവ), Sakhotavrksam (സഖോതവൃക്ഷം), Ṭinḍa-paruva (ടിൻഡ പരുവ)
- Telugu: Baranikā (బరానికా), Baranki (బారంకి), Barinikā (బారినికా)
- Kannada: Akhōr Mōranu (ಅಖೋರ್ ಮೊರನು), Miṭālā (ಮಿಟಾಲಾ)
- Bengali: Shāorā (শাওড়া), Sāhrā (শাহড়া), Shewrā (শ্যেওড়া)
- Oriya: Sāhāṛā (ସାହାଡ଼ା) hirtonimranu
- Assamese: Khoruā (খৰুআ), Sāurā gās (শাওৰা গাছ)
- Khasi: dieng sohkhyrdang
- Sanskrit: akshadhara, bhutavasa, bhutavriksha, dhukavasa, gavakshi, karkashachhada
- Malay: Kesinai (کسيناي)
- Thai: Khoi (ต้นข่อย)
- Sinhala: nithulla (නිතුල්ල)
- Tagalog: kalyós

== Uses ==
=== Papermaking ===
The tree has a number of uses. It has been important in papermaking in Thailand for seven hundred years. Virtually all of the ancient Thai documents still in existence are written on the bark of this tree. The Buddhist texts and official records from before the twentieth century in Thailand are known as khoi books. The paper is durable even in the local high-humidity climate. It does not burn easily and it is resistant to yellowing and insect damage. Today other fiber sources are used to make paper and khoi fibers are used primarily by artisans who produce paper using traditional techniques.

In Vietnam traditional woodworking uses the coarse texture of the leaves as natural sandpaper.

=== Health ===
Various parts of the plant are used in Ayurveda and other folk medicines for the treatment of different ailments such as filariasis, leprosy, toothache, diarrhoea, and cancer. It is a well known and documented ethnomedicinal plant. Research carried out using different in vitro and in vivo techniques of biological evaluation support most of these claims.

It has been used in the past as an oral hygiene product and for this reason it is also known as the toothbrush tree. A twig or stick about eight inches long with a frayed or mashed end to increase the cleaning surface was used as a tooth cleaning aid up until the middle of the twentieth century when the cheap and more practical plastic brush with a toothpaste become common throughout the world. It is the main active ingredient of a popular brand of a herbal, dark brown toothpaste in Thailand.

Different studies were carried on its antibacterial activity upon various microorganisms involving oral and nasopharyngeal infections and especially Streptococcus mutans. An extract of Strebulus asper leaves have demonstrated to possess a selective bactericidal activity towards Streptococcus, especially to S. mutans which has been shown to be strongly linked with dental caries.

The Khoi wood is used throughout Southeast Asia as an ingredient mixed with cannabis which reduces the throat irritation associated with inhaling cannabis smoke through a water pipe or bong.

Khoi bark

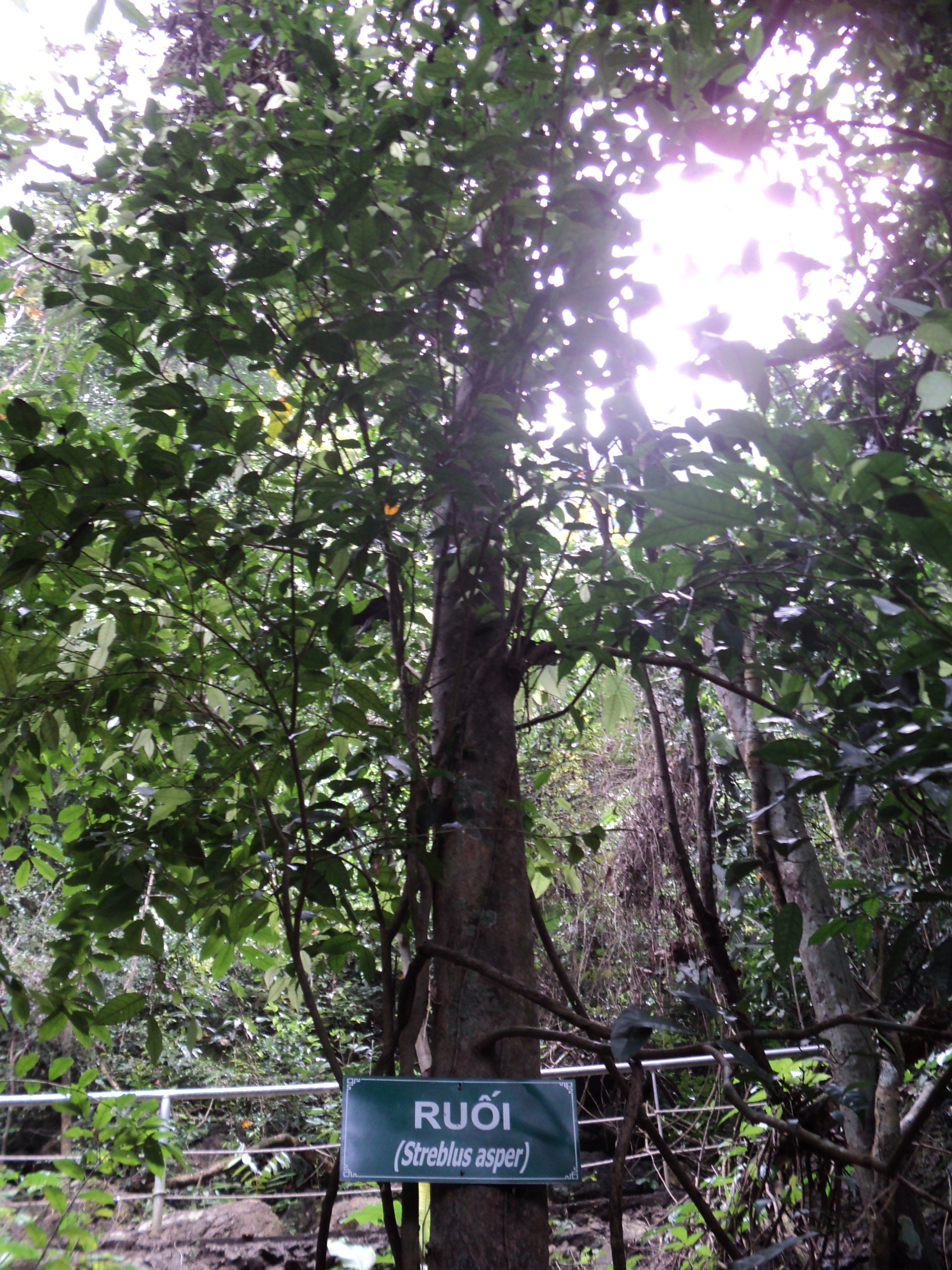
A Streblus asper tree in Phong Nha-Kẻ Bàng National Park

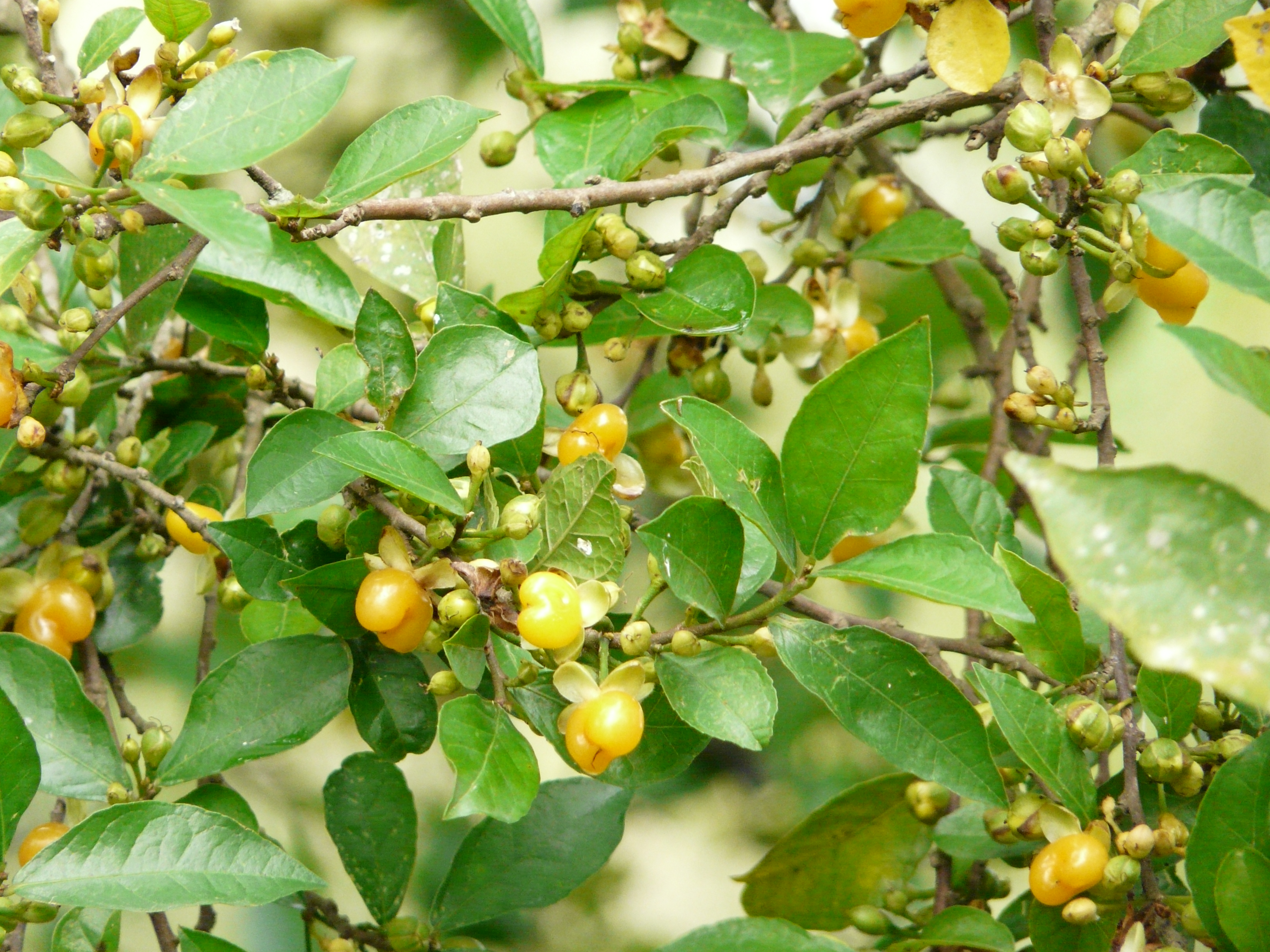
Fruits of Streblus asper

=== Protein coagulation ===
Streblus Asper contains protease which has a potential as a milk coagulating enzyme.
