= Taxotrophis =

Scientific classification
- Kingdom: Plantae
- Clade: Tracheophytes
- Clade: Angiosperms
- Clade: Eudicots
- Clade: Rosids
- Order: Rosales
- Family: Moraceae
- Genus: Taxotrophis; Blume (1856)

Synonyms
- Balanostreblus Kurz (1873); Dimerocarpus Gagnep. (1921); Phyllochlamys Bureau (1873); Pseudotrophis Warb. (1891)

Genus of flowering plants

Taxotrophis is a genus of flowering plants in the mulberry family, Moraceae. It includes six species native to tropical Asia and New Guinea, ranging from the Indian subcontinent through Indochina, southern China, and Malesia to New Guinea.

== Species ==
Six species are accepted.

- Taxotrophis ilicifolia (Kurz) S.Vidal
- Taxotrophis macrophylla (Blume) Boerl.
- Taxotrophis perakensis (Corner) E.M.Gardner
- Taxotrophis spinosa (Blume) Steenis
- Taxotrophis taxoides (B.Heyne ex Roth) Chew ex E.M.Gardner
- Taxotrophis zeylanica (Thwaites) Thwaites
