= Paratrophis insignis =

Conservation status
- Least Concern (IUCN 3.1)

Scientific classification
- Kingdom: Plantae
- Clade: Tracheophytes
- Clade: Angiosperms
- Clade: Eudicots
- Clade: Rosids
- Order: Rosales
- Family: Moraceae
- Genus: Paratrophis
- Species: P. insignis

Binomial name
- Paratrophis insignis (Bureau) E.M.Gardner

Synonyms
- Morus exsucca Planch. ex Koidz., pro syn.; Morus insignis Bureau; Morus marmolii Legname; Morus peruviana Planchon ex Koidzumi; Morus trianae J.F.Leroy

Species of tree

Paratrophis insignis is an evergreen tree native to Central and South America, ranging from Chiapas to Guatemala and from Costa Rica to northwestern Venezuela and northwestern Argentina. It grows in wet montane forests at elevations between 500 and 3,000 metres (1,600 and 9,800 feet).
