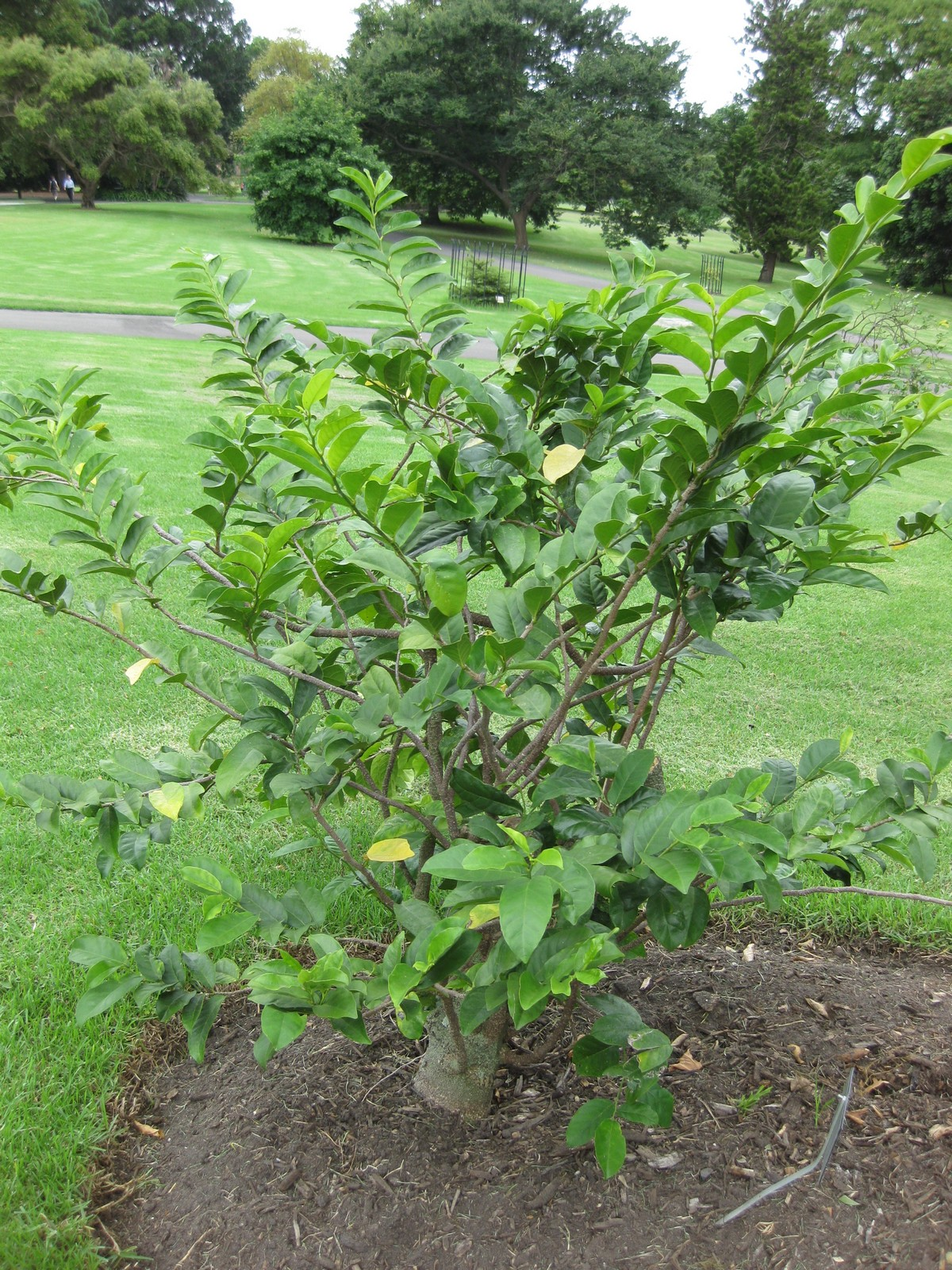
- Paratrophis smithii

Scientific classification
- Kingdom: Plantae
- Clade: Tracheophytes
- Clade: Angiosperms
- Clade: Eudicots
- Clade: Rosids
- Order: Rosales
- Family: Moraceae
- Genus: Paratrophis; Blume (1856)

Synonyms
- Calpidochlamys Diels 1935; Chevalierodendron J.-F.Leroy 1948; Pseudomorus Bureau 1869; Uromorus Bureau in A.P.de Candolle 1873

= Paratrophis =

Genus of flowering plants

Paratrophis is a genus of 12 species of plants in the mulberry family.

== Species ==
Species of the genus Paratrophis according to Plants of the World Online As of April 2024:

Image	Name	Distribution
	Paratrophis anthropophagorum (Seem.) Warb. 1891	Cook Is., Fiji, Marquesas, Niue, Samoa, Society Is., Tonga, Tubuai Is., Vanuatu
	Paratrophis ascendens (Corner) E.M.Gardner 2021	New Guinea, Solomon Is.
	Paratrophis australiana C.T.White 1933	Australia (Queensland)
	Paratrophis banksii Cheeseman 1906	New Zealand
	Paratrophis glabra (Merr.) Steenis 1934	Borneo, Malaya, New Guinea, Philippines, Solomon Is., Sulawesi, Sumatera
	Paratrophis insignis (Bureau) E.M.Gardner 2021	Argentina Northwest, Bolivia, Colombia, Costa Rica, Ecuador, Guatemala, Mexico (Chiapas), Panamá, Peru, Venezuela
	Paratrophis microphylla (Raoul) Cockayne 1915	New Zealand
	Paratrophis pendulina (Endl.) E.M.Gardner 2021	Caroline Is., Fiji, Hawaii, Marianas, New Caledonia, New Guinea, New South Wales, Norfolk Is., Queensland, Tubuai Is., Vanuatu
	Paratrophis philippinensis (Bureau) Fern.-Vill. 1880	Bismarck Archipelago, Borneo, Lesser Sunda Is., Maluku, New Guinea, Philippines, Sulawesi
	Paratrophis sclerophylla (Corner) E.M.Gardner 2021	New Caledonia
	Paratrophis smithii Cheeseman 1888	New Zealand
	Paratrophis solomonensis (Corner) E.M.Gardner 2021	Solomon Islands
