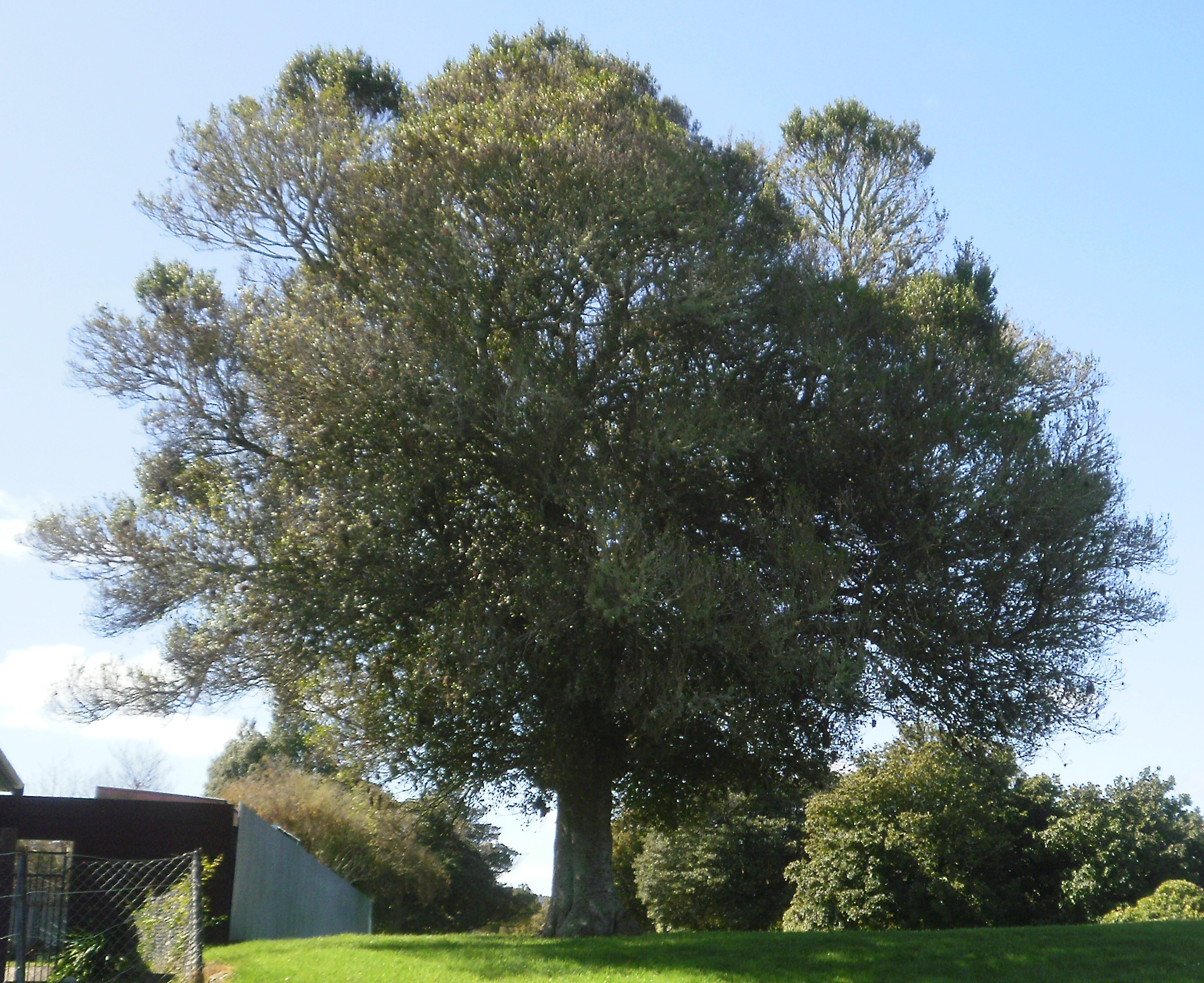

Conservation status
- Least Concern (IUCN 3.1)

Scientific classification
- Kingdom: Plantae
- Clade: Tracheophytes
- Clade: Angiosperms
- Clade: Eudicots
- Clade: Rosids
- Order: Rosales
- Family: Moraceae
- Genus: Paratrophis
- Species: P. microphylla

Binomial name
- Paratrophis microphylla (Raoul) Cockayne (1915)

Synonyms
- Epicarpurus microphyllus Raoul (1844); Paratrophis heterophylla Blume (1856); Paratrophis opaca Druce (1917), nom. superfl.; Streblus heterophyllus (Blume) Corner (1962); Taxotrophis microphylla (Raoul) F.Muell. (1868); Trophis opaca Banks & Sol. ex Hook.f. (1853), nom. superfl.

= Paratrophis microphylla =

Species of tree

Paratrophis microphylla, commonly known as the small-leaved milk tree, is a species of plant in the family Moraceae that is endemic to New Zealand.

== Description ==
As a juvenile plant, P. microphylla has distinctive fiddle-shaped leaves and a divaricating growth pattern. It grows in areas of lowland forest where it will grow into a tree around 12 metres (39 feet) high.

The small-leaved milk tree flowers from the middle of spring to summer, with red berries following from late spring to autumn.

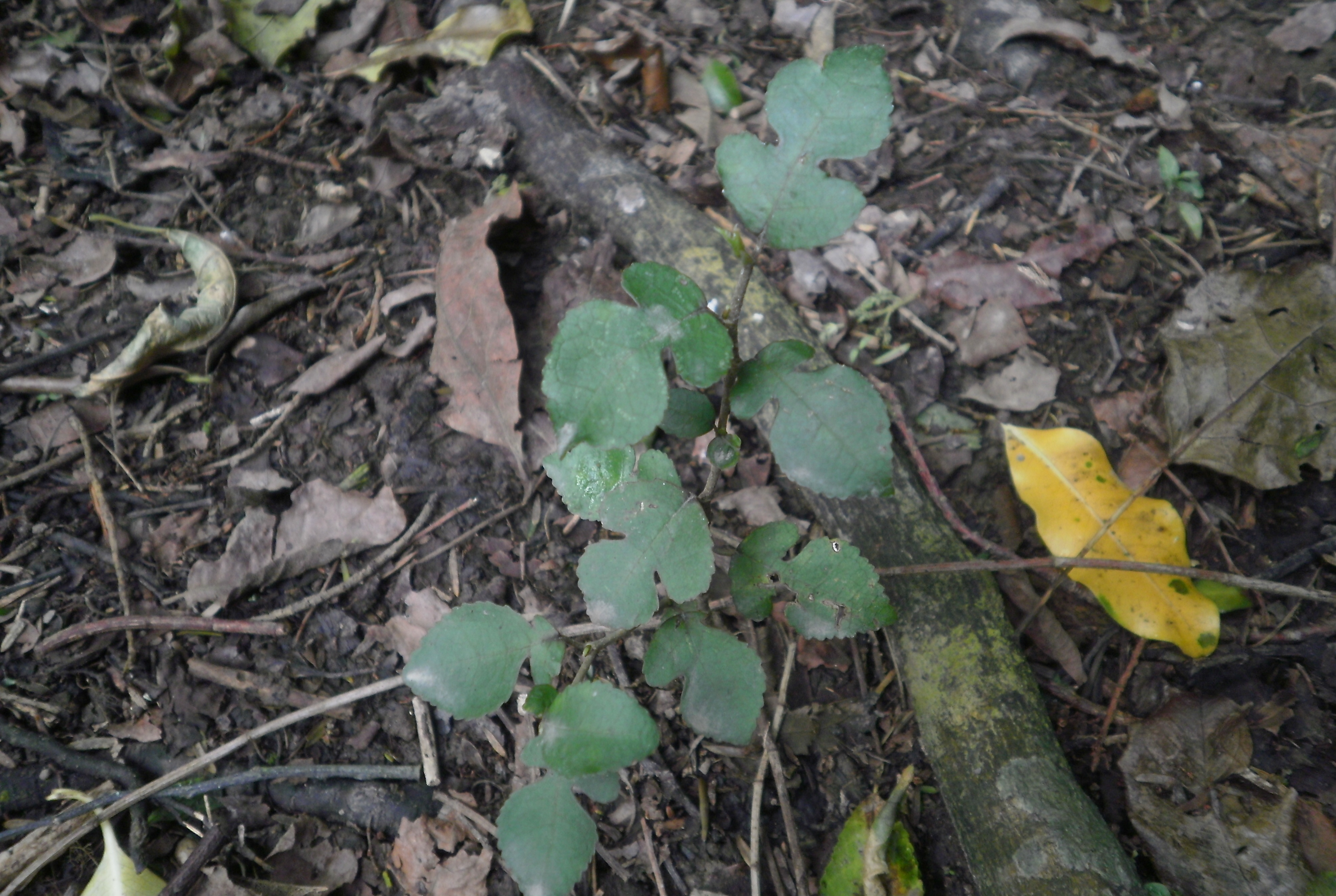
Small-leaved milk tree seedling with its juvenile foliage

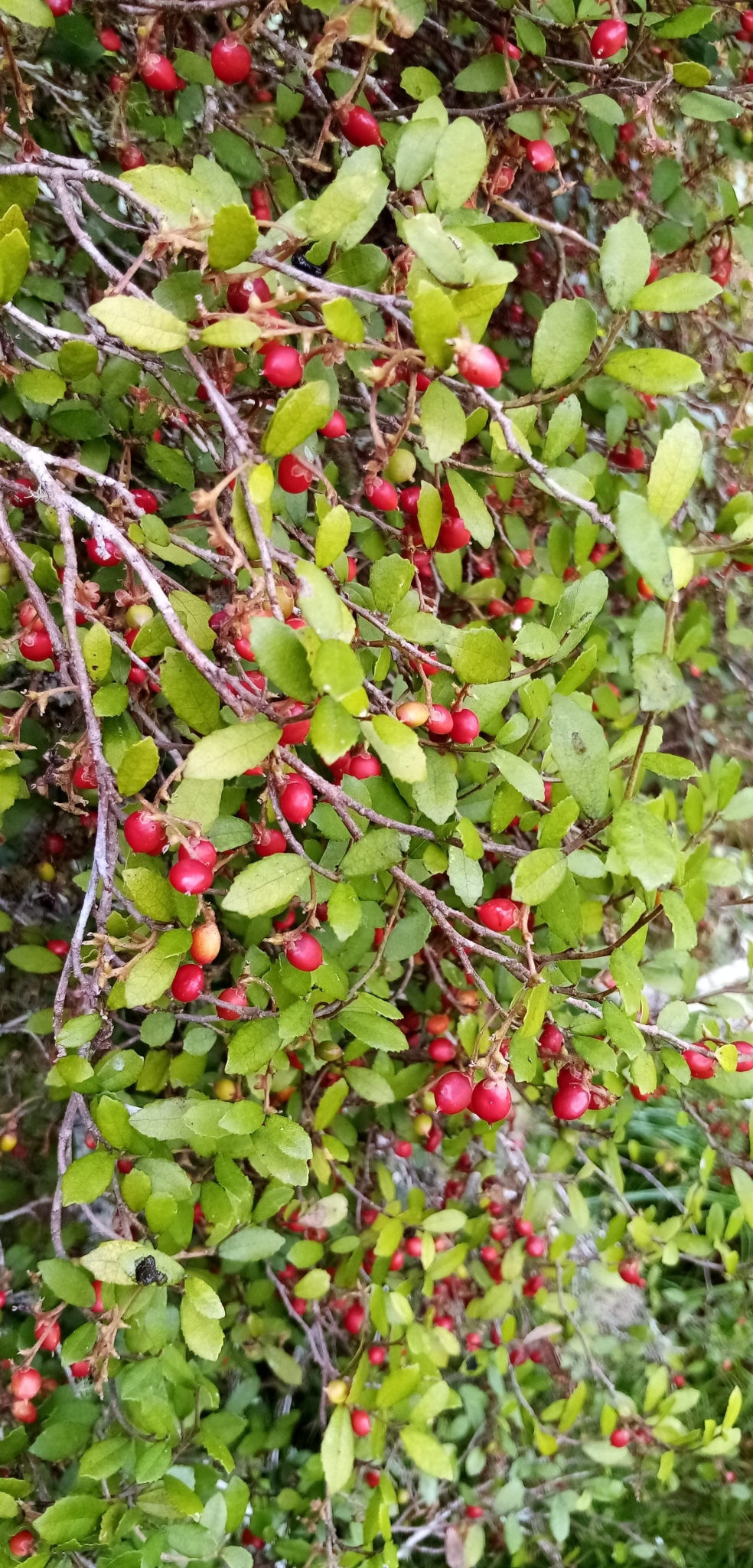
Foliage with berries
