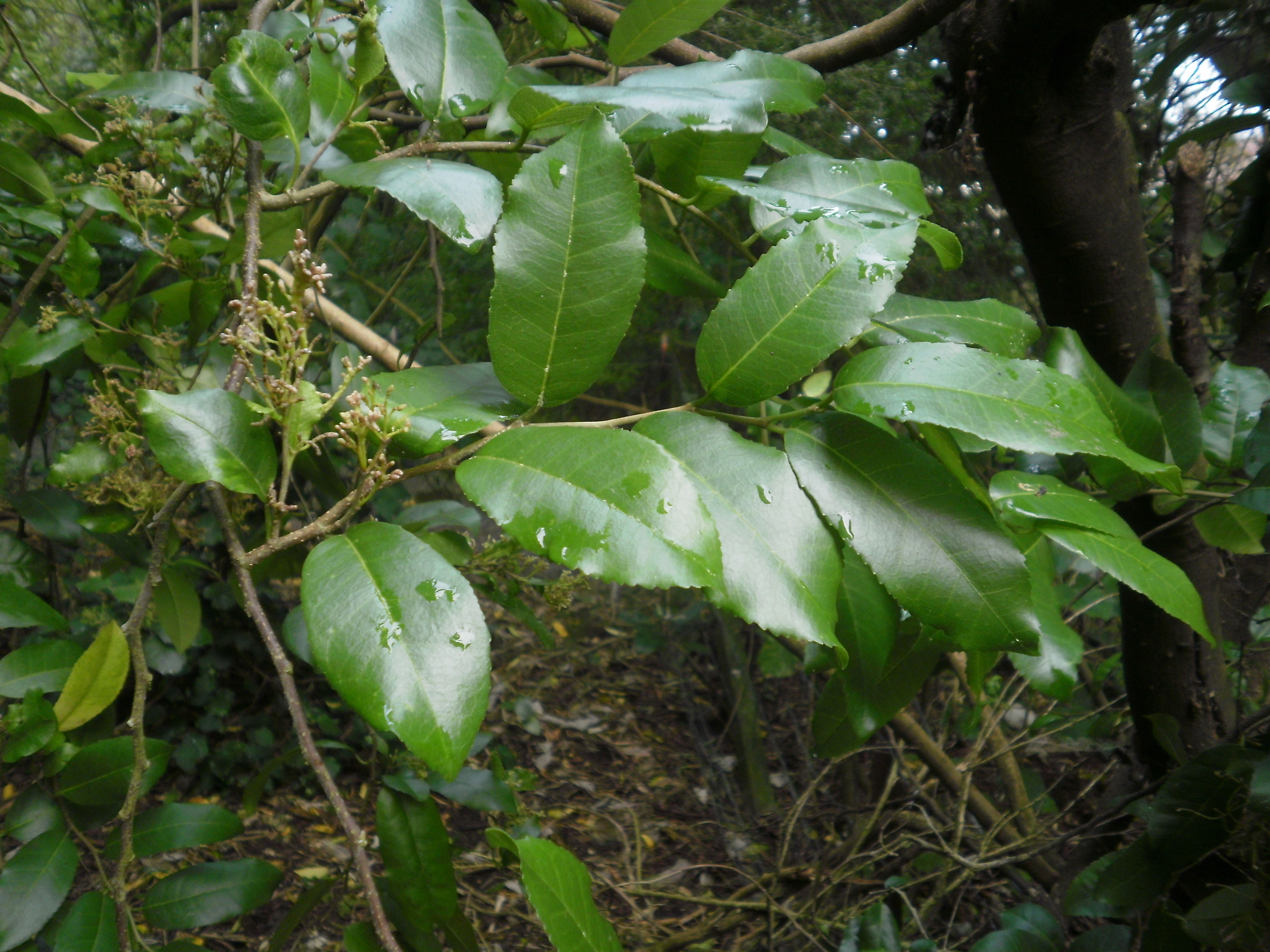

Conservation status
- Near Threatened (IUCN 3.1)

Scientific classification
- Kingdom: Plantae
- Clade: Tracheophytes
- Clade: Angiosperms
- Clade: Eudicots
- Clade: Rosids
- Order: Rosales
- Family: Moraceae
- Genus: Paratrophis
- Species: P. banksii

Binomial name
- Paratrophis banksii Cheeseman (1906)

Synonyms
- Paratrophis heterophylla var. elliptica Kirk (1896 publ. 1897); Streblus banksii (Cheeseman) C.J.Webb (1987); Streblus heterophyllus var. ellipticus (Kirk) Corner (1962)

= Paratrophis banksii =

Species of tree

Paratrophis banksii, commonly known as the large-leaved milk tree or by the Māori name ewekuri, is a species of plant in the family Moraceae that is endemic to New Zealand. The name "milk tree" comes from the milky sap the tree exudes when cut or damaged.

== Range ==
Streblus banksii is found in areas of coastal and lowland forest in the North Island and Marlborough, where it can grow 9–12 metres (30–39 feet) high. It is now also found on Mana Island, where it has been planted in several locations to aid in reforestation.

== Description ==
The leaves are 4–9 centimetres (1 1/2–3 1/2 inches) long and net-veined with a toothed edge. The tree has numerous bright yellow flowers between September and November followed by bright red-orange ovoid fruits.

== Ecology ==
The leaves, fruit, and seeds are heavily browsed by rodents and possums. The milk tree responds well to rodent removal.
