= Paratrophis sclerophylla =

Conservation status
- Near Threatened (IUCN 3.1)

Scientific classification
- Kingdom: Plantae
- Clade: Tracheophytes
- Clade: Angiosperms
- Clade: Eudicots
- Clade: Rosids
- Order: Rosales
- Family: Moraceae
- Genus: Paratrophis
- Species: P. sclerophylla

Binomial name
- Paratrophis sclerophylla (Corner) E.M.Gardner (2021)

Synonyms
- Streblus sclerophyllus Corner (1970)

Species of flowering plant

Paratrophis sclerophylla is a species of flowering plant in the family Moraceae. It is a tree endemic to New Caledonia.
