= Taxotrophis taxoides =

Conservation status
- Least Concern (IUCN 3.1)

Scientific classification
- Kingdom: Plantae
- Clade: Tracheophytes
- Clade: Angiosperms
- Clade: Eudicots
- Clade: Rosids
- Order: Rosales
- Family: Moraceae
- Genus: Taxotrophis
- Species: T. taxoides

Binomial name
- Taxotrophis taxoides (B.Heyne ex Roth) Chew ex E.M.Gardner (2021)

Synonyms
- Albrandia spinosa (Steud. ex Wight) D.Dietr. (1852); Epicarpurus involucratus Zipp. ex Span. (1841), pro syn.; Epicarpurus spinosus (Roxb.) Wight (1853); Epicarpurus timorensis Decne. (1834); Phyllochlamys spinosa (Steud. ex Wight) Bureau (1873); Phyllochlamys taxoides (B.Heyne ex Roth) Koord. (1912); Phyllochlamys taxoides var. parvifolia Merr. (1920); Phyllochlamys tridentata Gagnep. (1928); Phyllochlamys wallichii King ex Hook.f. (1888); Streblus crenatus (Gagnep.) Corner (1962); Streblus microphylla Kurz (1875); Streblus taxoides (B.Heyne ex Roth) Kurz (1875); Taxotrophis crenata Gagnep. (1928); Taxotrophis poilanei Gagnep. (1928); Taxotrophis roxburghii Blume (1856); Trophis heyneana Wall. (1831), not validly publ.; Trophis spinosa Roxb. (1832), nom. illeg.; Trophis taxiformis Spreng. (1826), nom. superfl.; Trophis taxoides B.Heyne ex Roth (1821) (basionym)

Species of flowering plant

Taxotrophis taxoides is a species of plant in the family Moraceae, tribe Moreae. It is a medium-sized, spiny bush (as in its Vietnamese name duối gai) found in the sub-canopy layer of Asian tropical forests. This species can be found in India, Bangladesh, Sri Lanka, Indo-China, Hainan, Peninsular Malaysia, the Philippines, Java, the Maluku Islands, and the Lesser Sunda Islands. No subspecies are listed in the Catalogue of Life. It is dioecious, with male and female flowers borne on separate plants.
