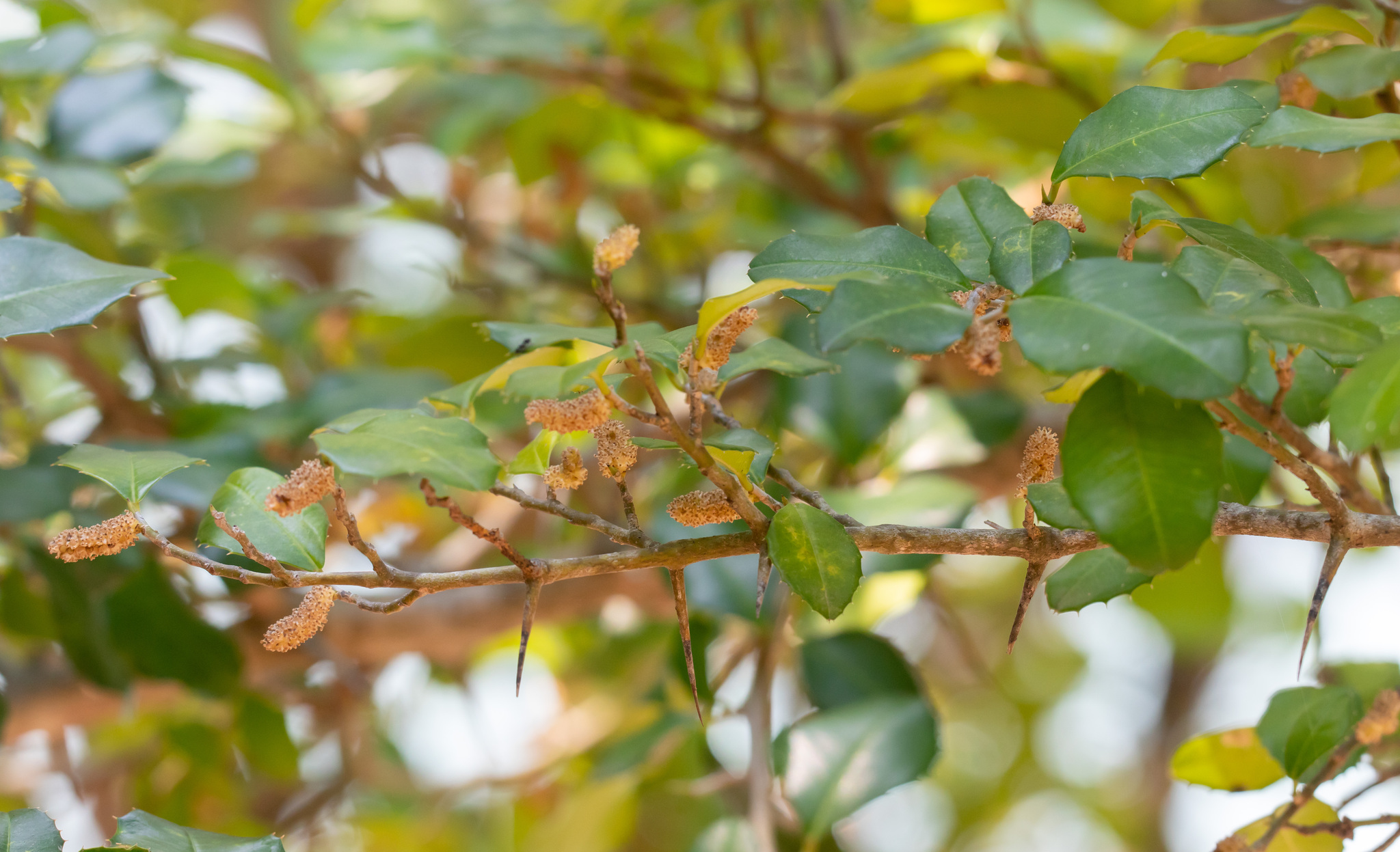
- S. ilicifolia from Thailand

Conservation status
- Least Concern (IUCN 3.1)

Scientific classification
- Kingdom: Plantae
- Clade: Tracheophytes
- Clade: Angiosperms
- Clade: Eudicots
- Clade: Rosids
- Order: Rosales
- Family: Moraceae
- Genus: Taxotrophis
- Species: T. ilicifolia

Binomial name
- Taxotrophis ilicifolia (Kurz) S.Vidal

Synonyms
- Balanostreblus ilicifolia Kurz (1873); Pseudotrophis laxiflora Warb. (1891); Streblus ilicifolius (Kurz) Corner (1962); Streblus laxiflorus (Hutch.) Corner (1962); Taxotrophis aquifolioides W.C.Ko (1963); Taxotrophis eberhardtii Gagnep. (1928); Taxotrophis laxiflora Hutch. (1918); Taxotrophis obtusa Elmer (1913); Taxotrophis triapiculata Gamble (1913)

= Taxotrophis ilicifolia =

Species of flowering plant

Taxotrophis ilicifolia is a species of flowering plant belonging to the family Moraceae. Its native range is China (Southern Yunnan, Guangxi, and Hainan) to Indochina, eastern India and Bangladesh, Malesia, and New Guinea.
