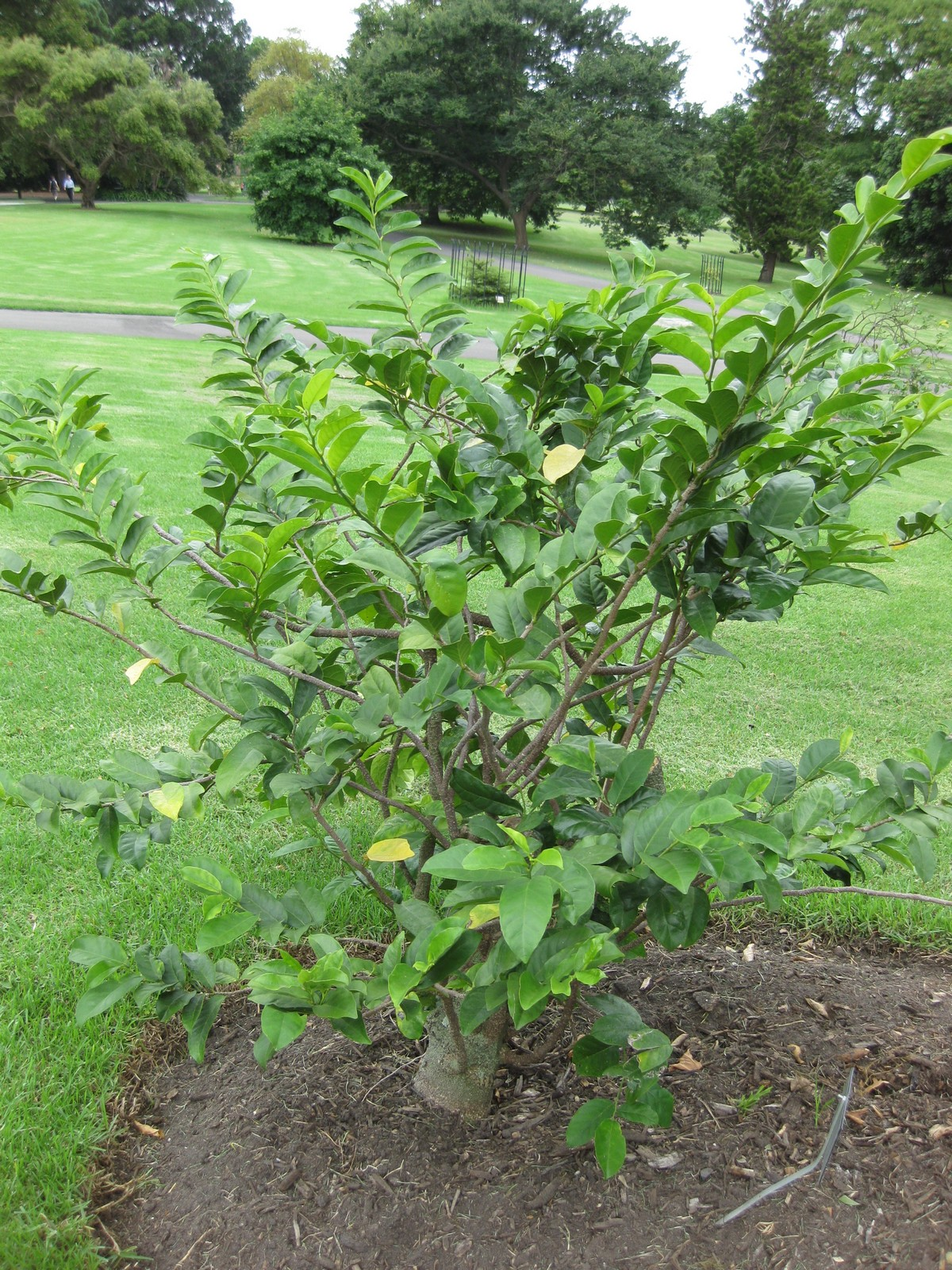

Conservation status
- Least Concern (IUCN 3.1)

Scientific classification
- Kingdom: Plantae
- Clade: Tracheophytes
- Clade: Angiosperms
- Clade: Eudicots
- Clade: Rosids
- Order: Rosales
- Family: Moraceae
- Genus: Paratrophis
- Species: P. smithii

Binomial name
- Paratrophis smithii Cheeseman (1887 publ. 1888)

Synonyms
- Streblus smithii (Cheeseman) Corner (1962)

= Paratrophis smithii =

Species of tree

Paratrophis smithii (also known as Smith's milkwood and the Three Kings milk tree) is a species of plant in the family Moraceae. It is endemic to Three Kings Islands, New Zealand. The bark exudes a thick white (often referred to as a milk-like) sap when cut. The flowers are small and unisexual and the fruit is either achene or drupe.

== Gallery ==
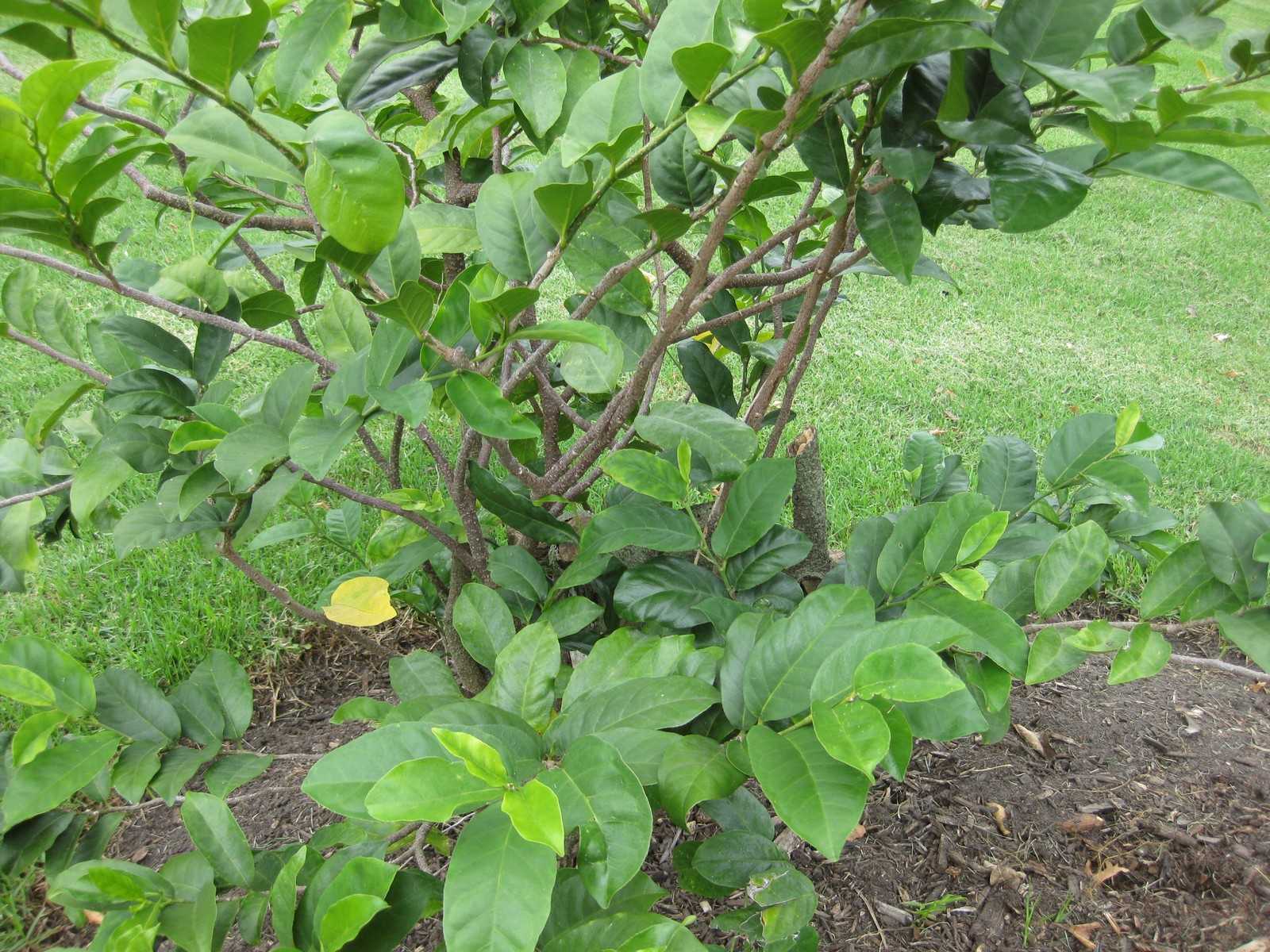
