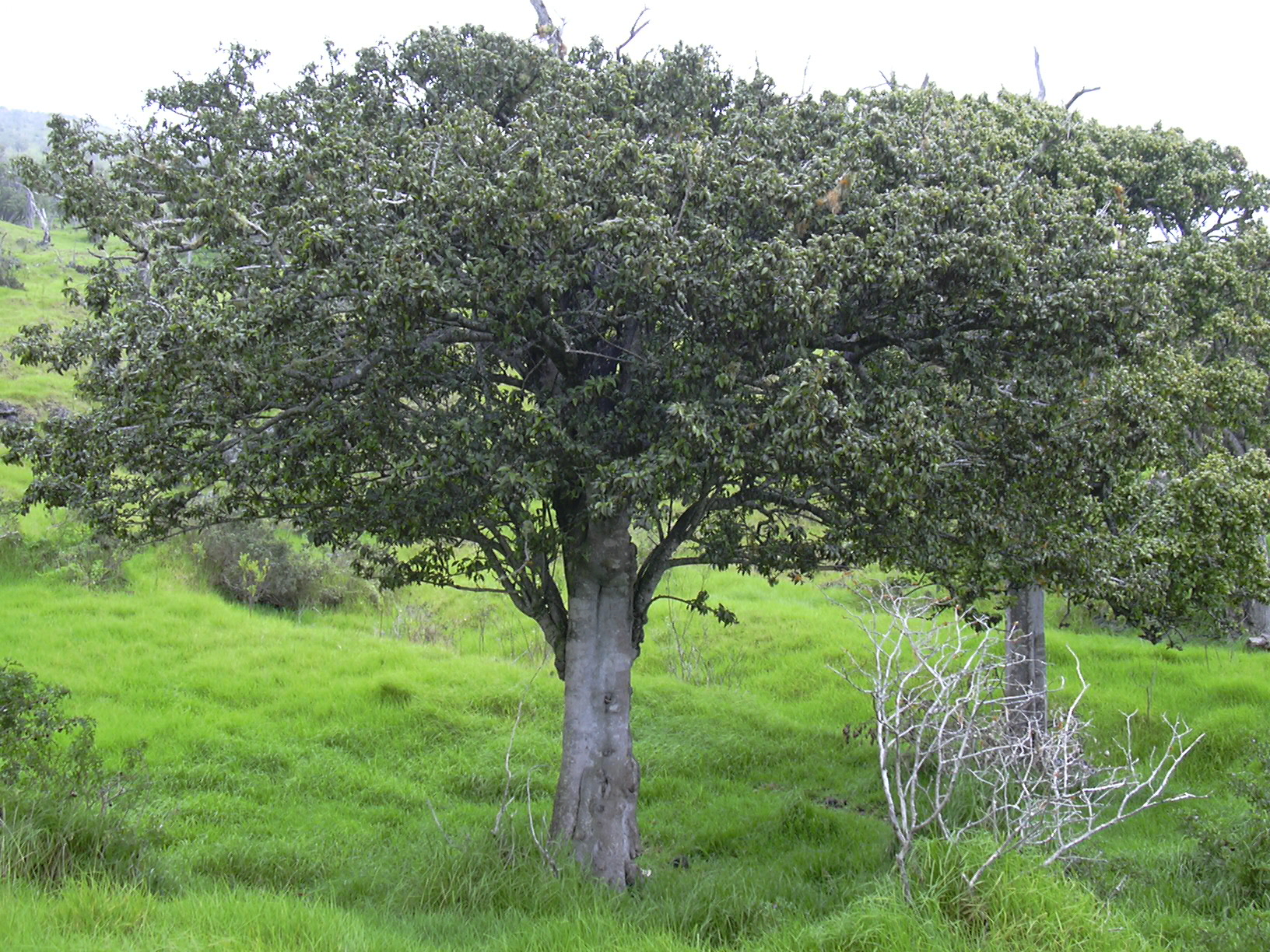
- Aʻiaʻi on Maui

Conservation status
- Least Concern (IUCN 3.1)

Scientific classification
- Kingdom: Plantae
- Clade: Tracheophytes
- Clade: Angiosperms
- Clade: Eudicots
- Clade: Rosids
- Order: Rosales
- Family: Moraceae
- Genus: Paratrophis
- Species: P. pendulina

Binomial name
- Paratrophis pendulina (Endl.) E.M.Gardner

Synonyms
- 16 synonyms: Homotypic synonyms; Morus pendulina Endl.; Pseudomorus brunoniana var. pendulina (Endl.) Bureau; Pseudomorus pendulina (Endl.) Stearn; Streblus pendulinus (Endl.) F.Muell.; Heterotypic synonyms; Morus brunoniana Endl.; Pseudomorus brunoniana (Endl.) Bureau; Pseudomorus brunoniana var. australiana Bureau; Pseudomorus brunoniana subvar. castaneifolia Bureau; Pseudomorus brunoniana var. obtusata Bureau; Pseudomorus brunoniana var. sandwicensis (O.Deg.) Skottsb.; Pseudomorus brunoniana scabra Bureau; Pseudomorus pendulina var. australiana Stearn; Pseudomorus sandwicensis O.Deg.; Streblus brunonianus (Endl.) F.Muell.; Boehmeria castaneifolia A.Cunn. ex Loudon; Procris castaneifolia Endl.

= Paratrophis pendulina =

Species of flowering plant

Paratrophis pendulina is a species of flowering plant in the mulberry family, Moraceae. In Australia it is commonly known as whalebone tree, and other common names include the white handlewood, axe-handle wood, grey handlewood and prickly fig. In Hawaii it is known as Hawai'i roughbush or aʻiaʻi in Hawaiian.

It is native to New South Wales and Queensland in eastern Australia, and to New Guinea, the Caroline Islands, Mariana Islands, Norfolk Island, New Caledonia, Vanuatu, Fiji, the Tubuai Islands, and the Hawaiian Islands. It is usually a small tree or shrub, reaching a height of 12 metres (39 feet) with a trunk diameter of 0.6 m (2 ft).

== Description ==
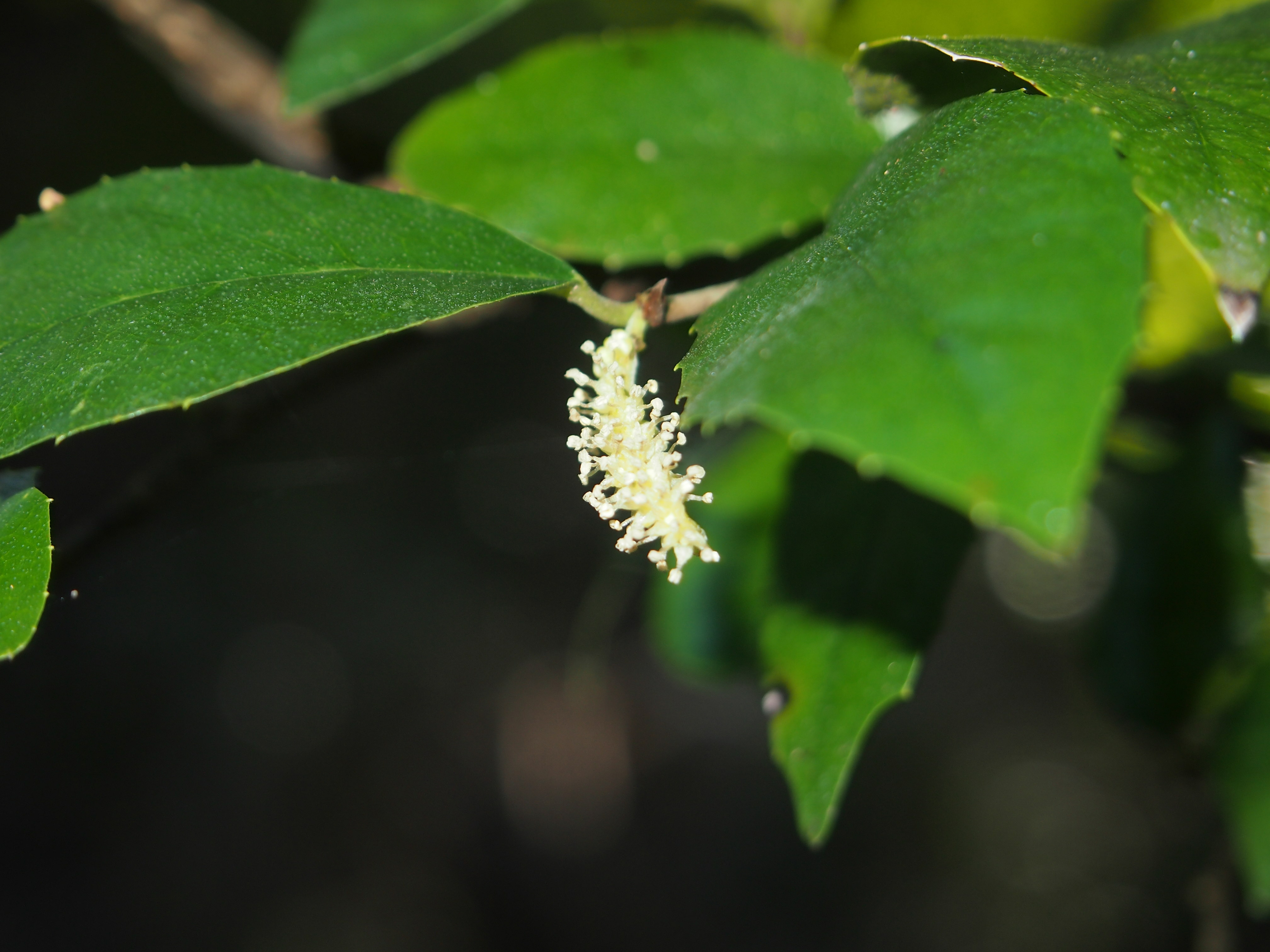
Paratrophis pendulina flowers

The species can be a large shrub or small tree, rarely growing into a large tree 30 metres (98 feet) tall and 40 centimetres (16 inches) in trunk diameter. The trunk is mostly cylindrical or flanged. The bark is brown, featuring lines of vertical pustules.

The leaves are thin with a long pointed tip. 5 to 8 cm (2 to 3 1/4 in) long, alternate and simple. Usually finely toothed. The underside of the leaf is hairy, the top is glossy and mid green in colour. Leaf venation is more evident on the undersurface. Unlike in other species, the lateral veins do not terminate in leaf serrations.

Flowers appear from September to May. Male flowers appear on spikes, female flowers on small clusters or spikes. The fruit matures from January to May, being a yellow coloured berry, 4 to 6 millimetres (1/8 to 1/4 in) long. The seeds are round, pale in colour and 3 mm in diameter.

== Taxonomy ==
In Australia this species is treated as Streblus brunonianus (Endl.) F.Muell., and in the US it is treated as Streblus pendulinus (Endl.) F. Muell..

== Habitat and ecology ==
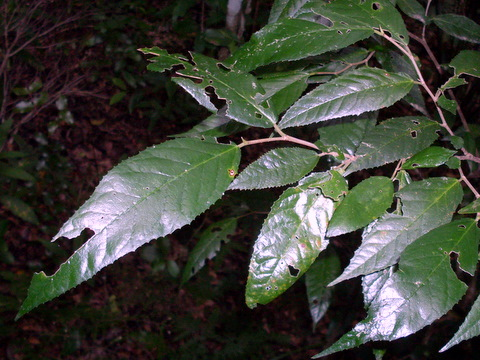
Whalebone tree in a jungle understorey at the Allyn River, Barrington Tops, Australia

In Australia it is found east of the Great Dividing Range, from near Milton (35° S) in the southern Illawarra district of New South Wales to Cape York Peninsula at Australia's northern tip. It commonly grows in a variety of different types of tropical, subtropical, and warm-temperate rainforest, particularly by streams.

Germination from fresh seed occurs without difficulty within seven weeks. The fruit is eaten by birds including the brown cuckoo dove, green catbird, Lewin's honeyeater, rose crowned fruit dove and topknot pigeon.

In Hawaii it inhabits dry, coastal mesic, mixed mesic and wet forests from sea level to 1,675 m (5,495 ft) elevation.
