= Paralogistis litholeuca =

Scientific classification
- Kingdom: Animalia
- Phylum: Arthropoda
- Class: Insecta
- Order: Lepidoptera
- Family: Scythrididae
- Genus: Paralogistis
- Species: P. litholeuca

Binomial name
- Paralogistis litholeuca Meyrick, 1921

Species of moth

Paralogistis litholeuca is a moth of the family Scythrididae. It was described by Edward Meyrick in 1921. It is found in Mozambique and Gauteng, South Africa. Lepidoptera and Some Other Life Forms gives this name as a synonym of Paralogistis ochrura.

The wingspan is about 17 mm. The forewings are grey whitish finely irrorated (sprinkled) with blackish. The markings are formed of coarser black irroration: some undefined suffusion towards the base of the costa, a dot beneath the fold at an irregular raised transverse mark from the dorsum before the middle of the wing reaching somewhat beyond the fold, and a round submedian dot above the tornus. The hindwings are grey.
