= Bactrianoscythris pamirica =

Scientific classification
- Kingdom: Animalia
- Phylum: Arthropoda
- Class: Insecta
- Order: Lepidoptera
- Family: Scythrididae
- Genus: Bactrianoscythris
- Species: B. pamirica

Binomial name
- Bactrianoscythris pamirica (Passerin d'Entrèves & Roggero, 2008)

Synonyms
- Scythris pamirica Passerin d'Entrèves & Roggero, 2008

Species of moth

Bactrianoscythris pamirica is a moth of the family Scythrididae. It was described by Pietro Passerin d'Entrèves and Angela Roggero in 2008. It is found in Afghanistan, where it has been recorded from the Pamir Mountains.

The wingspan is about 20 mm. Adults have been recorded on wing in July.
