= Falkovitshella mongholica =

Scientific classification
- Domain: Eukaryota
- Kingdom: Animalia
- Phylum: Arthropoda
- Class: Insecta
- Order: Lepidoptera
- Family: Scythrididae
- Genus: Falkovitshella
- Species: F. mongholica

Binomial name
- Falkovitshella mongholica (Passerin d'Entrèves & Roggero, 2006)

Synonyms
- Scythris mongholica Passerin d'Entrèves & Roggero, 2006

Species of moth

Falkovitshella mongholica is a moth of the family Scythrididae. It was described by Pietro Passerin d'Entrèves and Angela Roggero in 2006. It is found in Mongolia and Uzbekistan.

The wingspan is about 10 millimetres (0.39 in).
