= Haploscythris chloraema =

Scientific classification
- Kingdom: Animalia
- Phylum: Arthropoda
- Class: Insecta
- Order: Lepidoptera
- Family: Scythrididae
- Genus: Haploscythris
- Species: H. chloraema

Binomial name
- Haploscythris chloraema (Meyrick, 1887)

Synonyms
- Butalis chloraema Meyrick, 1887; Scythris obstans Meyrick, 1928; Ephysteris obstans; Haploscythris paulianella Viette, 1956

Species of moth

Haploscythris chloraema is a moth in the family Scythrididae. It was described by Edward Meyrick in 1887. It is found in Botswana, Madagascar, Namibia and South Africa.

The wingspan is about 13 mm. The forewings are pale grey, irrorated (sprinkled) with grey. The plical and first discal stigmata are well marked, blackish, the plical obliquely anterior, the second discal only indicated by two or three blackish scales. The hindwings are grey.
