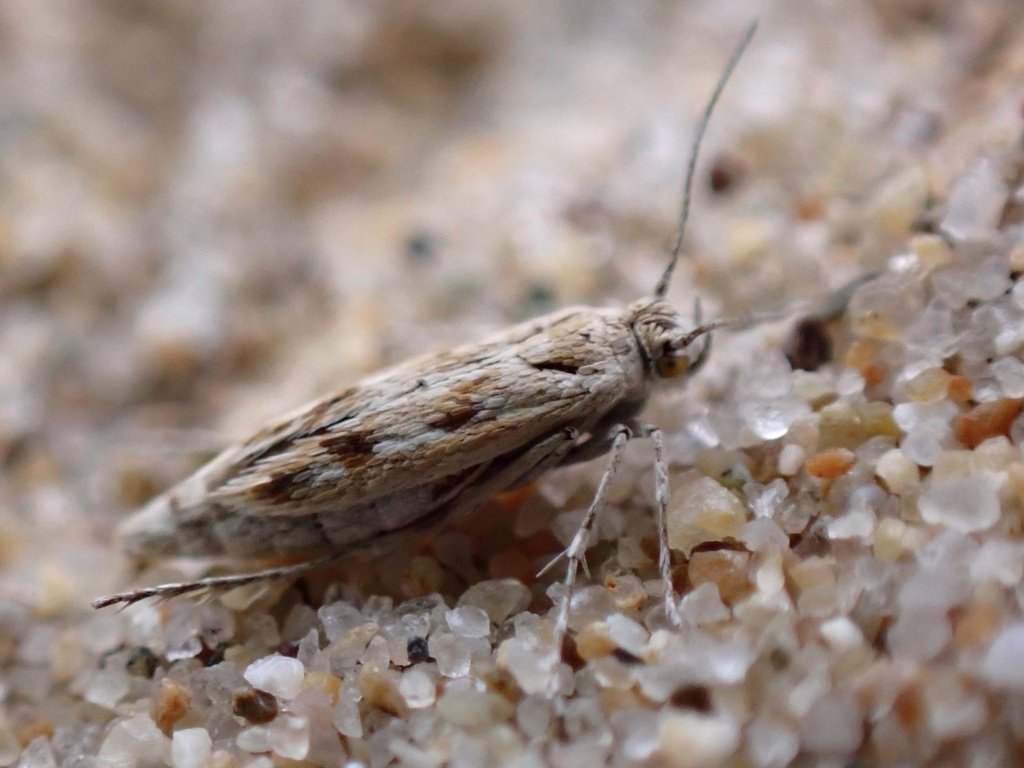

Scientific classification
- Kingdom: Animalia
- Phylum: Arthropoda
- Clade: Pancrustacea
- Class: Insecta
- Order: Lepidoptera
- Family: Scythrididae
- Genus: Areniscythris
- Species: A. brachypteris

Binomial name
- Areniscythris brachypteris Powell, 1976

= Areniscythris brachypteris =

Species of moth

Areniscythris brachypteris, the Oso Flaco flightless moth or sand-dune grasshopper moth, is a moth of the family Scythrididae. It was described by Jerry A. Powell in 1976. It is found in the coastal sand dunes of California.
