= Bactrianoscythris satyrella =

Scientific classification
- Domain: Eukaryota
- Kingdom: Animalia
- Phylum: Arthropoda
- Class: Insecta
- Order: Lepidoptera
- Family: Scythrididae
- Genus: Bactrianoscythris
- Species: B. satyrella

Binomial name
- Bactrianoscythris satyrella (Staudinger, 1880)

Synonyms
- Butalis satyrella Staudinger, 1880; Scythris satyrella; Butalis matronella Staudinger, 1880; Butalis vitilella Christoph, 1885

Species of moth

Bactrianoscythris satyrella is a moth of the family Scythrididae. It was described by Staudinger in 1880. It is found in Iran, Turkey, Kazakhstan and Turkmenistan.
