= Mapsidius auspicata =

Scientific classification
- Domain: Eukaryota
- Kingdom: Animalia
- Phylum: Arthropoda
- Class: Insecta
- Order: Lepidoptera
- Family: Scythrididae
- Genus: Mapsidius
- Species: M. auspicata

Binomial name
- Mapsidius auspicata Walsingham, 1907

Species of moth

Mapsidius auspicata is a moth of the family Scythrididae. It was first described by Lord Walsingham in 1907. It is endemic to the Hawaiian islands of Kauai, Oahu, Lanai and Hawaii.

The larvae feed on Charpentiera species. The larva live in a dense white silken tunnel on the leaves of their host.
