= Haploscythris canispersa =

Scientific classification
- Kingdom: Animalia
- Phylum: Arthropoda
- Class: Insecta
- Order: Lepidoptera
- Family: Scythrididae
- Genus: Haploscythris
- Species: H. canispersa

Binomial name
- Haploscythris canispersa (Meyrick, 1913)

Synonyms
- Scythris canispersa Meyrick, 1913

Species of moth

Haploscythris canispersa is a moth of the family Scythrididae. It was described by Edward Meyrick in 1913. It is found in Gauteng, South Africa.

The wingspan is about 16 mm. The forewings are rather light bronzy fuscous with some irregular indistinct whitish suffusion towards the base of the dorsum, along the fold, and on the apical third. The stigmata are darker fuscous and indistinct, the first discal beyond the middle, approximated to the second, the plical very obliquely before the first discal. The hindwings are rather dark grey.
