= Falkovitshella pediculella =

Scientific classification
- Kingdom: Animalia
- Phylum: Arthropoda
- Clade: Pancrustacea
- Class: Insecta
- Order: Lepidoptera
- Family: Scythrididae
- Genus: Falkovitshella
- Species: F. pediculella

Binomial name
- Falkovitshella pediculella (Bengtsson, 1997)

Synonyms
- Scythris pediculella Bengtsson, 1997

Species of moth

Falkovitshella pediculella is a moth of the family Scythrididae. It was described by Bengt Å. Bengtsson in 1997. It is found in Tunisia.
