= Neoscythris fissirostris =

Scientific classification
- Kingdom: Animalia
- Phylum: Arthropoda
- Class: Insecta
- Order: Lepidoptera
- Family: Scythrididae
- Genus: Neoscythris
- Species: N. fissirostris

Binomial name
- Neoscythris fissirostris (Meyrick, 1928)

Synonyms
- Scythris fissirostris Meyrick, 1928

Species of moth

Neoscythris fissirostris is a moth of the family Scythrididae. It was described by Edward Meyrick in 1928. It is found in North America, where it has been recorded from Arizona, California, Kansas, New Mexico and Texas.

The wingspan is 10–15 mm. The forewings are grey with a moderate white median streak from the base to about two-thirds or three-fourths, cut by a fine line along the fold, sometimes partially edged by dark fuscous suffusion, often with the plical and second discal stigmata appearing as dark fuscous spots on its lower margin and in its apex respectively. The costal edge is white except towards the base. The remainder of the wing variably strewn or suffusedly streaked with white. The hindwings are grey.
