= Paralogistis symmocidoides =

Scientific classification
- Kingdom: Animalia
- Phylum: Arthropoda
- Clade: Pancrustacea
- Class: Insecta
- Order: Lepidoptera
- Family: Scythrididae
- Genus: Paralogistis
- Species: P. symmocidoides

Binomial name
- Paralogistis symmocidoides Bengtsson, 2014

Species of moth

Paralogistis symmocidoides is a moth of the family Scythrididae. It was described by Bengt Å. Bengtsson in 2014. It is found in Kenya.
