= Bactrianoscythris drepanella =

Scientific classification
- Kingdom: Animalia
- Phylum: Arthropoda
- Class: Insecta
- Order: Lepidoptera
- Family: Scythrididae
- Genus: Bactrianoscythris
- Species: B. drepanella

Binomial name
- Bactrianoscythris drepanella Passerin d'Entrèves & Roggero, 2009

Species of moth

Bactrianoscythris drepanella is a moth of the family Scythrididae. It was described by Pietro Passerin d'Entrèves and Angela Roggero in 2009. It is found in Afghanistan.
