= Falkovitshella asthena =

Scientific classification
- Domain: Eukaryota
- Kingdom: Animalia
- Phylum: Arthropoda
- Class: Insecta
- Order: Lepidoptera
- Family: Scythrididae
- Genus: Falkovitshella
- Species: F. asthena

Binomial name
- Falkovitshella asthena (Falkovitsh, 1972)

Synonyms
- Scythris asthena Falkovitsh, 1972

Species of moth

Falkovitshella asthena is a moth of the family Scythrididae. It was described by Mark I. Falkovitsh in 1972. It is found in Turkmenistan and Uzbekistan.
