= Bactrianoscythris lorella =

Scientific classification
- Kingdom: Animalia
- Phylum: Arthropoda
- Clade: Pancrustacea
- Class: Insecta
- Order: Lepidoptera
- Family: Scythrididae
- Genus: Bactrianoscythris
- Species: B. lorella

Binomial name
- Bactrianoscythris lorella Bengtsson, 2014

Species of moth

Bactrianoscythris lorella is a moth of the family Scythrididae. It was described by Bengt Å. Bengtsson in 2014. It is found in Kenya.
