= Mapsidius iridescens =

Scientific classification
- Domain: Eukaryota
- Kingdom: Animalia
- Phylum: Arthropoda
- Class: Insecta
- Order: Lepidoptera
- Family: Scythrididae
- Genus: Mapsidius
- Species: M. iridescens

Binomial name
- Mapsidius iridescens Walsingham, 1907

Species of moth

Mapsidius iridescens is a moth of the family Scythrididae. It was first described by Lord Walsingham in 1907. It is endemic to the Hawaiian island of Kauai, and is notable for the somewhat iridescent coloration of its forewings.

In its larval stage, the species feeds on the leaves of Charpentiera species.
