= Falkovitshella hypolepta =

Scientific classification
- Kingdom: Animalia
- Phylum: Arthropoda
- Class: Insecta
- Order: Lepidoptera
- Family: Scythrididae
- Genus: Falkovitshella
- Species: F. hypolepta

Binomial name
- Falkovitshella hypolepta (Falkovitsh, 1972)

Synonyms
- Scythris hypolepta Falkovitsh, 1972

Species of moth

Falkovitshella hypolepta is a moth of the family Scythrididae. It was described by Mark I. Falkovitsh in 1972. It is found in Uzbekistan.
