= Mapsidius quadridentata =

Scientific classification
- Domain: Eukaryota
- Kingdom: Animalia
- Phylum: Arthropoda
- Class: Insecta
- Order: Lepidoptera
- Family: Scythrididae
- Genus: Mapsidius
- Species: M. quadridentata

Binomial name
- Mapsidius quadridentata Walsingham, 1907

Species of moth

Mapsidius quadridentata is a moth of the family Scythrididae. It is endemic to the Hawaiian islands of Lanai and Maui.

The larvae feed on Charpentiera species.
