= Mapsidius charpentierii =

Scientific classification
- Domain: Eukaryota
- Kingdom: Animalia
- Phylum: Arthropoda
- Class: Insecta
- Order: Lepidoptera
- Family: Scythrididae
- Genus: Mapsidius
- Species: M. charpentierii

Binomial name
- Mapsidius charpentierii Swezey, 1932

Species of moth

Mapsidius charpentierii is a moth of the family Scythrididae. It was first described by Otto Herman Swezey in 1932. It is endemic to the Hawaiian island of Oahu.
