= Mapsidius chenopodii =

Scientific classification
- Domain: Eukaryota
- Kingdom: Animalia
- Phylum: Arthropoda
- Class: Insecta
- Order: Lepidoptera
- Family: Scythrididae
- Genus: Mapsidius
- Species: M. chenopodii

Binomial name
- Mapsidius chenopodii Swezey, 1947

Species of moth

Mapsidius chenopodii is a moth of the family Scythrididae. It was first described by Otto Herman Swezey in 1947. It is endemic to the island of Hawaii.

The larvae feed on Chenopodium oahuense.
