= Bactrianoscythris afghana =

Scientific classification
- Domain: Eukaryota
- Kingdom: Animalia
- Phylum: Arthropoda
- Class: Insecta
- Order: Lepidoptera
- Family: Scythrididae
- Genus: Bactrianoscythris
- Species: B. afghana

Binomial name
- Bactrianoscythris afghana Passerin d'Entrèves & Roggero, 2009

Species of moth

Bactrianoscythris afghana is a moth of the family Scythrididae. It was described by Pietro Passerin d'Entrèves and Angela Roggero in 2009. It is found in Afghanistan.
