= Neoscythris =

Scientific classification
- Kingdom: Animalia
- Phylum: Arthropoda
- Clade: Pancrustacea
- Class: Insecta
- Order: Lepidoptera
- Family: Scythrididae
- Genus: Neoscythris; Landry, 1991

Genus of moths

Neoscythris is a genus of moths in the family Scythrididae.

== Species ==
- Neoscythris confinis (Braun, 1920)
- Neoscythris euthia (Walsingham, 1914)
- Neoscythris fissirostris (Meyrick, 1928)
- Neoscythris planipenella (Chambers, 1875)
