= Bactrianoscythris =

Scientific classification
- Kingdom: Animalia
- Phylum: Arthropoda
- Clade: Pancrustacea
- Class: Insecta
- Order: Lepidoptera
- Family: Scythrididae
- Genus: Bactrianoscythris; Passerin d'Entrèves & Roggero, 2009

Species
- See text

Genus of moths

Bactrianoscythris is a genus of gelechioid moths, which is mostly placed in the flower moth family, which is sometimes included as a subfamily in the Xyloryctidae, or together with these merged into the Oecophoridae.

== Species ==
- Bactrianoscythris afghana Passerin d'Entrèves & Roggero, 2009
- Bactrianoscythris annae Passerin d'Entrèves & Roggero, 2009
- Bactrianoscythris drepanella Passerin d'Entrèves & Roggero, 2009
- Bactrianoscythris ginevrae Passerin d'Entrèves & Roggero, 2009
- Bactrianoscythris khinjani Passerin d'Entrèves & Roggero, 2009
- Bactrianoscythris lorella Bengtsson, 2014
- Bactrianoscythris pamirica (Passerin d'Entrèves & Roggero, 2008)
- Bactrianoscythris satyrella (Staudinger, 1880)
