= Paralogistis ochrura =

Scientific classification
- Kingdom: Animalia
- Phylum: Arthropoda
- Class: Insecta
- Order: Lepidoptera
- Family: Scythrididae
- Genus: Paralogistis
- Species: P. ochrura

Binomial name
- Paralogistis ochrura (Meyrick, 1913)

Synonyms
- Homothamnis litholeuca Meyrick, 1921

Species of moth

Paralogistis ochrura is a moth of the family Scythrididae. It was described by Edward Meyrick in 1913. It is found in Gauteng, South Africa.

The wingspan is 11–17 mm. The forewings are white, variably speckled with dark grey and with a transverse fascia of blackish irroration (sprinkles) near the base, becoming obsolescent near the dorsum. There is a slightly oblique grey fascia mixed with blackish at two-thirds, narrow on the costa and gradually dilated posteriorly to the dorsum, where it is extended vaguely to near the tornus. There is a grey blotch speckled with darker extending along the posterior half of the costa to the apex and a blackish dot above the tornus. The hindwings are grey.

The larvae feed on Acacia zanzibarica.
