= Mapsidius =

Scientific classification
- Kingdom: Animalia
- Phylum: Arthropoda
- Clade: Pancrustacea
- Class: Insecta
- Order: Lepidoptera
- Family: Scythrididae
- Genus: Mapsidius; Walsingham, 1907

Species
- See text

Genus of moths

Mapsidius is a genus of gelechioid moths, which is mostly placed in the flower moth family, which is sometimes included as a subfamily in the Xyloryctidae, or together with these merged into the Oecophoridae. The genus is known only from the Hawaiian Islands.

== Species ==
- Mapsidius auspicata Walsingham, 1907
- Mapsidius charpentierii Swezey, 1932
- Mapsidius chenopodii Swezey, 1947
- Mapsidius iridescens Walsingham, 1907
- Mapsidius quadridentata Walsingham, 1907
