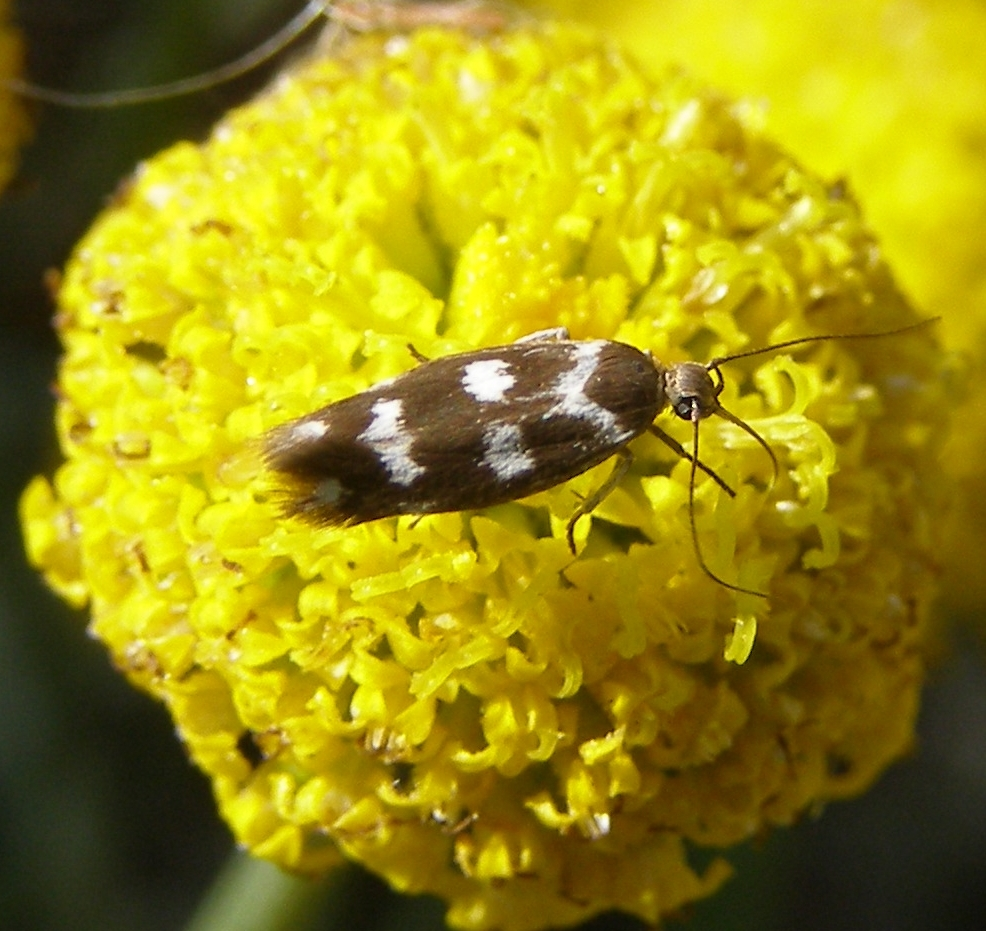

Scientific classification
- Kingdom: Animalia
- Phylum: Arthropoda
- Class: Insecta
- Order: Lepidoptera
- Family: Scythrididae
- Genus: Scythris
- Species: S. scopolella

Binomial name
- Scythris scopolella (Linnaeus, 1767)

Synonyms
- Phalaena scopolella Linnaeus, 1767; Tinea scopolella Hübner, [1799]; Lita triguttella Duponchel, 1840; Butalis biforella Staudinger, 1859; Butalis humillimella Staudinger, 1859; Butalis heleniella Millière, 1876; Scythris tenietella Caradja, 1920; Scythris gredosella Schmidt, 1941

= Scythris scopolella =

Species of moth

Scythris scopolella is a species of moth of the family Scythrididae. It is found from the Iberian Peninsula, north to Belgium, east to Poland, the Czech Republic, Austria, and Italy. It is also found in Bulgaria and on Crete.

Adults are on wing from May to the end of June. They are active during daytime.

The larvae feed on Tortula muralis, Helianthemum, Hypericum, Sedum, and mosses growing on walls.
