= Erigethes =

Scientific classification
- Kingdom: Animalia
- Phylum: Arthropoda
- Class: Insecta
- Order: Lepidoptera
- Family: Scythrididae
- Genus: Erigethes; Walsingham, 1907
- Species: E. strobilacei

Binomial name
- Erigethes strobilacei Walsingham, 1907

Species of moth

Erigethes strobilacei is a moth of the family Scythrididae, and the only species in the genus Erigethes. It was described by Baron Walsingham in 1907. It is found in Algeria, Morocco and Tunisia.

The wingspan is 10–13 mm. The forewings are yellowish white, speckled and mottled with olive-grey, becoming darker or more fuscous in certain spots, these are indistinctly separable from the profuse speckling which commences a little beyond the base, three are placed on the line of the fold at equal distances, the outer one being a little beyond the middle of the wing. There is also a small spot about the flexus, another beyond the end of the cell, and the speckling about the end of the termen is somewhat grouped, with intermediate pale spaces at and below the apex, it is also partly distributed through the pale whitish cinereous cilia. The hindwings are very pale bronzy grey. The species is extremely abundant toward the latter end of March and in the beginning of April.

The larvae feed ob Halocnemon strobilaceum.
