= Haploscythris =

Scientific classification
- Kingdom: Animalia
- Phylum: Arthropoda
- Class: Insecta
- Order: Lepidoptera
- Family: Scythrididae
- Genus: Haploscythris; Viette, 1956

Synonyms
- Atkinsonia Stainton, 1859

Genus of moths

Haploscythris is a genus of moths in the family Scythrididae.

== Species ==
- Haploscythris albifuscella Bengtsson, 2014
- Haploscythris brachiohirsutella Bengtsson, 2014
- Haploscythris brachiotruncella Bengtsson, 2014
- Haploscythris brunneopicta Bengtsson, 2014
- Haploscythris canispersa (Meyrick, 1913)
- Haploscythris chloraema (Meyrick, 1887)
- Haploscythris coffeella Bengtsson, 2014
- Haploscythris eberti Bengtsson, 2014
- Haploscythris haackei Bengtsson, 2014
- Haploscythris indecorella Bengtsson, 2014
- Haploscythris kuboosensis Bengtsson, 2014
- Haploscythris melanodora (Meyrick, 1912)
- Haploscythris obstans (Meyrick, 1928)
- Haploscythris ochrosuffusella Bengtsson, 2014
- Haploscythris paulianella Viette, 1956
- Haploscythris pugilella Bengtsson, 2014
- Haploscythris quadrivalvella Bengtsson, 2014
- Haploscythris richtersveldensis Bengtsson, 2014
- Haploscythris scoblei Bengtsson, 2014
- Haploscythris sordidella (Bengtsson, 2002)
- Haploscythris streyi Bengtsson, 2014
- Haploscythris valvaecrinitus Bengtsson, 2014
- Haploscythris vansoni Bengtsson, 2014
- Haploscythris vredendalensis Bengtsson, 2014
- Haploscythris vulturoides Bengtsson, 2014
- Haploscythris youngai Bengtsson, 2014
