= Rhamphura =

Scientific classification
- Kingdom: Animalia
- Phylum: Arthropoda
- Clade: Pancrustacea
- Class: Insecta
- Order: Lepidoptera
- Family: Scythrididae
- Genus: Rhamphura; J.-F. Landry, 1991

Genus of moths

Rhamphura is a genus of moths in the family Scythrididae.

== Species ==
- Rhamphura altisierrae (Keifer, 1937)
- Rhamphura ochristriata (Walsingham, 1888)
- Rhamphura perspicillella (Walsingham, 1888)
- Rhamphura suffusa (Walsingham, 1888)
