= Necrothalassia =

Scientific classification
- Kingdom: Animalia
- Phylum: Arthropoda
- Class: Insecta
- Order: Lepidoptera
- Family: Scythrididae
- Genus: Necrothalassia; Amsel, 1935
- Species: N. compsias

Binomial name
- Necrothalassia compsias (Walsingham, 1907)

Synonyms
- Scythris compsias Walsingham, 1907; Necrothalassia argilosella Amsel, 1935

Species of moth

Necrothalassia compsias is a moth of the family Scythrididae, and the only species in the genus Necrothalassia. It was described by Thomas de Grey, 6th Baron Walsingham, in 1907. It is found in Algeria, Morocco and the Palestinian territories.

The wingspan is 9–10 mm. The forewings are white, speckled and smeared with brownish grey, shading to greyish fuscous in an outwardly angulated transverse fascia before the middle, and in an irregularly scattered oblique band of spots beyond the middle, with a few scales of the same dark colour about the apex. The cilia are brownish grey, with some white scales overlapping their base. The hindwings are shining, iridescent rosy grey.
