= Falkovitshella =

Scientific classification
- Domain: Eukaryota
- Kingdom: Animalia
- Phylum: Arthropoda
- Class: Insecta
- Order: Lepidoptera
- Family: Scythrididae
- Genus: Falkovitshella; Passerin d'Entrèves & Roggero, 2007

Genus of moths

Falkovitshella is a genus of moths in the family Scythrididae.

== Species ==
There are 10 species described.

- Falkovitshella ammobia (Falkovitsh, 1972)
- Falkovitshella asema (Falkovitsh, 1972)
- Falkovitshella asthena (Falkovitsh, 1972)
- Falkovitshella deserticola (Nupponen, 2010) Passerin d'Entrèves & Roggero, 2013
- Falkovitshella hindukushi Passerin d'Entrèves & Roggero, 2013
- Falkovitshella hypolepta (Falkovitsh, 1972)
- Falkovitshella karvoneni (Nupponen, 2010) Passerin d'Entrèves & Roggero, 2013
- Falkovitshella mongholica (Passerin d'Entrèves & Roggero, 2006)
- Falkovitshella pediculella (Bengtsson, 1997)
- Falkovitshella physalis (Falkovitsh, 1972)
