= Episcythris =

Scientific classification
- Kingdom: Animalia
- Phylum: Arthropoda
- Class: Insecta
- Order: Lepidoptera
- Family: Scythrididae
- Genus: Episcythris; Amsel, 1939

Genus of moths

Episcythris is a genus of moths in the family Scythrididae.

== Species ==
- Episcythris arenicolorella Bengtsson, 1997
- Episcythris albiflua (Meyrick, 1928)
- Episcythris algirica Passerin d'Entrèves, 1991
- Episcythris amseli Passerin d'Entrèves, 1991
- Episcythris asymetrica Passerin d'Entrèves, 1991
- Episcythris bouhedmae Passerin d'Entrèves, 1991
- Episcythris cremorella (Zerny, 1935)
- Episcythris grossi Bengtsson, 1997
- Episcythris pseudoalbiflua Passerin d'Entrèves, 1991
- Episcythris triangulella (Ragonot, 1875)
- Episcythris walsinghami Passerin d'Entrèves, 1991
- Episcythris zuninoi Passerin d'Entrèves, 1990
