= Paralogistis =

Scientific classification
- Kingdom: Animalia
- Phylum: Arthropoda
- Class: Insecta
- Order: Lepidoptera
- Family: Scythrididae
- Genus: Paralogistis; Meyrick, 1913

Synonyms
- Homothamnis Meyrick, 1921

Genus of moths

Paralogistis is a genus of moth in the family Scythrididae.

== Species ==
- Paralogistis litholeuca Meyrick, 1921
- Paralogistis ochrura Meyrick, 1913
- Paralogistis raesaeneni Bengtsson, 2014
- Paralogistis symmocidoides Bengtsson, 2014
- Paralogistis willyi Bengtsson, 2014
