= Synacroloxis =

Scientific classification
- Kingdom: Animalia
- Phylum: Arthropoda
- Clade: Pancrustacea
- Class: Insecta
- Order: Lepidoptera
- Family: Scythrididae
- Genus: Synacroloxis; Gozmány, 1952
- Species: S. dis

Binomial name
- Synacroloxis dis Gozmány, 1952

Genus of moths

Synacroloxis is a monotypic moth genus in the family Scythrididae described by László Anthony Gozmány in 1952. Its only species, Synacroloxis dis, described by the same author in the same year, is found in Hungary.
