= Areniscythris =

Scientific classification
- Kingdom: Animalia
- Phylum: Arthropoda
- Clade: Pancrustacea
- Class: Insecta
- Order: Lepidoptera
- Family: Scythrididae
- Genus: Areniscythris; Powell, 1976

Genus of moths

Areniscythris is a genus of moths in the family Scythrididae.

== Species ==
- Areniscythris brachypteris Powell, 1976
- Areniscythris whitesands Metzler & Lightfoot, 2014
