= Asymmetrura =

Scientific classification
- Kingdom: Animalia
- Phylum: Arthropoda
- Clade: Pancrustacea
- Class: Insecta
- Order: Lepidoptera
- Family: Scythrididae
- Genus: Asymmetrura; Landry, 1991

Genus of moths

Asymmetrura is a genus of moths in the family Scythrididae.

== Species ==
- Asymmetrura albilineata (Walsingham, 1888)
- Asymmetrura brevistrigella (Chambers, 1875)
- Asymmetrura graminivorella (Braun, 1920)
- Asymmetrura impositella (Zeller, 1855)
- Asymmetrura reducta (Braun, 1923)
- Asymmetrura scintillifera (Braun, 1927)
