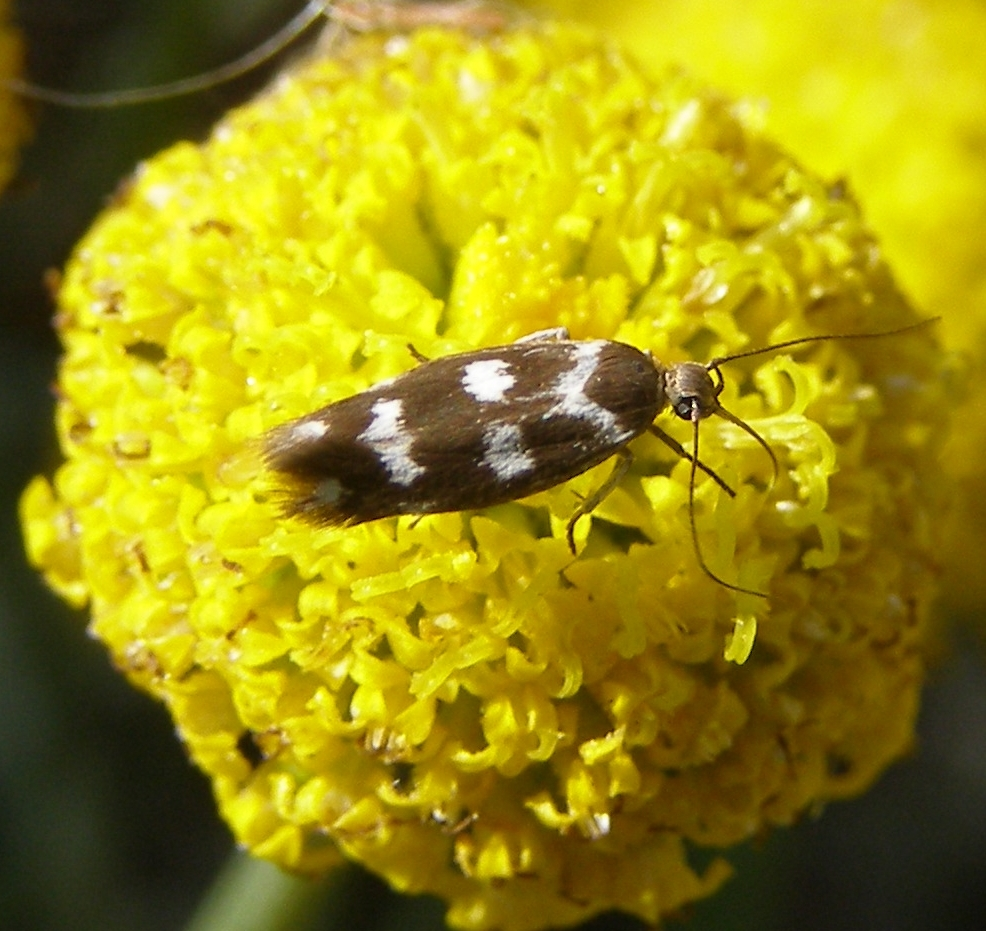
- Adult Scythris scopolella

Scientific classification
- Kingdom: Animalia
- Phylum: Arthropoda
- Clade: Pancrustacea
- Class: Insecta
- Order: Lepidoptera
- Infraorder: Heteroneura
- Clade: Eulepidoptera
- Clade: Ditrysia
- Clade: Apoditrysia
- Superfamily: Gelechioidea
- Family: Scythrididae; Rebel, 1901

Diversity
- About 30 genera and 669 species

Synonyms
- Scythridinae (but see text); Butalidae Heinemann & Wocke, 1876

= Scythrididae =

Flower moths

Family of moths

Scythrididae (flower moths) is a family of small moths in the superfamily Gelechioidea. The family is sometimes included in the Xyloryctidae as a subfamily Scythridinae, but the Xyloryctidae themselves have sometimes been included in the Oecophoridae as subfamily. Scythrididae adults are smallish to mid-sized moths, which when at rest appear teardrop-shaped.

== Selected genera ==
Genera of Scythrididae (with some notable species also listed) include:

- Apostibes Walsingham, 1907
- Areniscythris Powell, 1976
- Asymmetrura Landry, 1991
- Bactrianoscythris Passerin d'Entrèves & Roggero, 2009
- Catascythris
- Coleophorides Amsel, 1935
- Enolmis Duponchel, 1845
- Episcythris Amsel, 1939
- Eretmocera Zeller, 1852
- Erigethes Walsingham, 1907
- Falkovitshella Passerin d'Entrèves & Roggero, 2007
- Haploscythris Viette, 1956
- Mapsidius Walsingham, 1907
- Necrothalassia Amsel, 1935
- Neoscythris Landry, 1991
- Paralogistis Meyrick, 1921
- Parascythris Hanneman, 1960
- Proterochyta Meyrick, 1918
- Rhamphura Landry, 1991
- Scythris Hübner, [1825]
  - Scythris limbella
  - Scythris scopolella
- Synacroloxis Gozmány, 1952
