= D. indica =

D. indica may refer to:

- Defluviimonas indica, a species of bacterium isolated from a deep-sea hydrothermal vent
- Deroplatys indica, a species of dead leaf praying mantis
- Diaphana indica, the cucumber moth, a species of grass moth
- Dillenia indica, a species native to southeastern Asia
- Dipsas indica, the Amazonian snail-eater, a snake species found in South America
- Discradisca indica, a brachiopod species in the genus Discradisca
- Dorstenia indica, a species of small plant in the mulberry family
- Drimia indica, a species of flowering plant
- Drosera indica, a sundew, an insectivorous plant species native to tropical countries throughout the world

== Synonyms ==
- Derris indica, a synonym for Pongamia pinnata
- Duchesnea indica, a synonym for Potentilla indica

== See also ==
- Indica (disambiguation)
