= Dorstenia belizensis =

Scientific classification
- Kingdom: Plantae
- Clade: Tracheophytes
- Clade: Angiosperms
- Clade: Eudicots
- Clade: Rosids
- Order: Rosales
- Family: Moraceae
- Genus: Dorstenia
- Species: D. belizensis

Binomial name
- Dorstenia belizensis C.C.Berg

Species of flowering plant

Dorstenia belizensis is a plant species in the family Moraceae which is native to Belize.
