= Dorstenia brevipetiolata =

Scientific classification
- Kingdom: Plantae
- Clade: Tracheophytes
- Clade: Angiosperms
- Clade: Eudicots
- Clade: Rosids
- Order: Rosales
- Family: Moraceae
- Genus: Dorstenia
- Species: D. brevipetiolata

Binomial name
- Dorstenia brevipetiolata C.C.Berg

Species of flowering plant

Dorstenia brevipetiolata is a plant species of in the family Moraceae which is native to eastern Brazil. It is only known from a single collection made in April, 1839.
