= Dorstenia peruviana =

Scientific classification
- Kingdom: Plantae
- Clade: Tracheophytes
- Clade: Angiosperms
- Clade: Eudicots
- Clade: Rosids
- Order: Rosales
- Family: Moraceae
- Genus: Dorstenia
- Species: D. peruviana

Binomial name
- Dorstenia peruviana C.C.Berg

Synonyms
- Dorstenia boliviana C.C.Berg

Species of plant

Dorstenia peruviana is a plant species in the family Moraceae which is native to Peru and Bolivia.
