= Dorstenia carautae =

Scientific classification
- Kingdom: Plantae
- Clade: Tracheophytes
- Clade: Angiosperms
- Clade: Eudicots
- Clade: Rosids
- Order: Rosales
- Family: Moraceae
- Genus: Dorstenia
- Species: D. carautae

Binomial name
- Dorstenia carautae C.C.Berg

Species of flowering plant

Dorstenia carautae is a species of herbaceous plant in the family Moraceae which is native to eastern Brazil.
