= Dorstenia uxpanapana =

Scientific classification
- Kingdom: Plantae
- Clade: Tracheophytes
- Clade: Angiosperms
- Clade: Eudicots
- Clade: Rosids
- Order: Rosales
- Family: Moraceae
- Genus: Dorstenia
- Species: D. uxpanapana

Binomial name
- Dorstenia uxpanapana C.C.Berg & T.Wendt

Species of flowering plant

Dorstenia uxpanapana is a plant species in the family Moraceae.

It is endemic to Mexico, in an area of eastern Oaxaca and western Veracruz states.
