= Dorstenia albertii =

Scientific classification
- Kingdom: Plantae
- Clade: Tracheophytes
- Clade: Angiosperms
- Clade: Eudicots
- Clade: Rosids
- Order: Rosales
- Family: Moraceae
- Genus: Dorstenia
- Species: D. albertii

Binomial name
- Dorstenia albertii Carauta, C.Valente & O.M.Barth

Species of flowering plant

Dorstenia albertii is a plant species in the family Moraceae which is native to eastern Brazil. Plants reach a height of about 20 centimetres (7.9 in) tall. The stem, which is 2 to 3.5 millimetres (0.079 to 0.138 in) in diameter, is covered with fine hairs. The leaves, which emerge from the stem every 0.8 cm (0.31 in) in a spiral pattern, are 7 to 18 cm (2.8 to 7.1 in) long and 2 to 7.5 cm (0.8 to 3.0 in) broad. The species is only known from a single locality in Espírito Santo state in southeastern Brazil, in a moist, shady site. It is similar to D. grazielae, another Brazilian endemic.
