= Dorstenia panamensis =

Scientific classification
- Kingdom: Plantae
- Clade: Tracheophytes
- Clade: Angiosperms
- Clade: Eudicots
- Clade: Rosids
- Order: Rosales
- Family: Moraceae
- Genus: Dorstenia
- Species: D. panamensis

Binomial name
- Dorstenia panamensis C.C.Berg

Species of flowering plant

Dorstenia panamensis is a plant species in the family Moraceae which is native to Panama.
