= Dorstenia kameruniana =

Scientific classification
- Kingdom: Plantae
- Clade: Tracheophytes
- Clade: Angiosperms
- Clade: Eudicots
- Clade: Rosids
- Order: Rosales
- Family: Moraceae
- Genus: Dorstenia
- Species: D. kameruniana

Binomial name
- Dorstenia kameruniana Engl.

Species of flowering plants

Dorstenia kameruniana is a herbaceous plant species within the family Moraceae.

== Description ==
A shrub or small tree with thick leafy stems, sometimes reaching 6 m (20 ft) tall but often 3 m (10 ft) or less. Leaves have a distichous arrangement with a surface that is paper to leathery. The outline of the leaflets is lanceolate to elliptic, the length can reach 22 cm (9 in) and width capable of reaching 9 cm (3.5 in), while the margin tends to be dentate to lobed. The Inflorescence is commonly solitary, the peduncle is 2–9 mm (0.08–0.35 in) long.

== Distribution and habitat ==
Found in parts of West Africa in Guinea eastwards to Ivory Coast and then in Central and Eastern Africa from Cameroun to Tanzania. Occurs as an understorey in humid and gallery forests or at the edges of savannahs.
