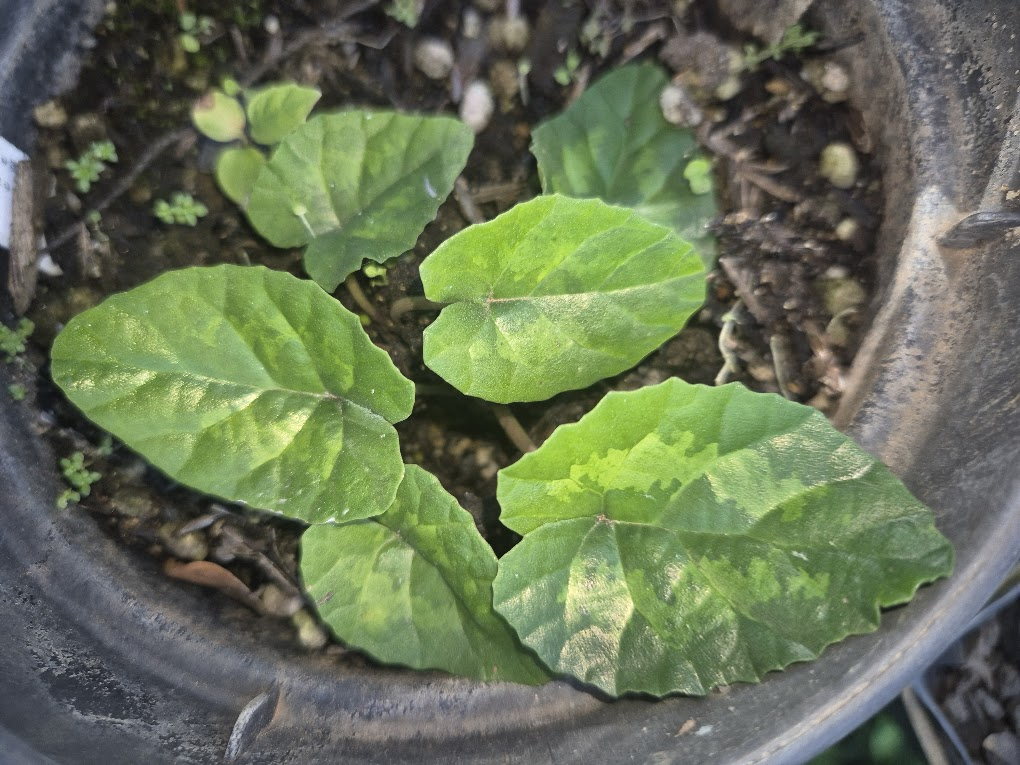
- Dorstenia cayapia, cultivated in door.

Scientific classification
- Kingdom: Plantae
- Clade: Embryophytes
- Clade: Tracheophytes
- Clade: Angiosperms
- Clade: Eudicots
- Clade: Rosids
- Order: Rosales
- Family: Moraceae
- Genus: Dorstenia
- Species: D. cayapia

Binomial name
- Dorstenia cayapia Vell.

= Dorstenia cayapia =

Species of flowering plant

Dorstenia cayapia is a species of plant in the family Moraceae which is native to Brazil and Bolivia.
