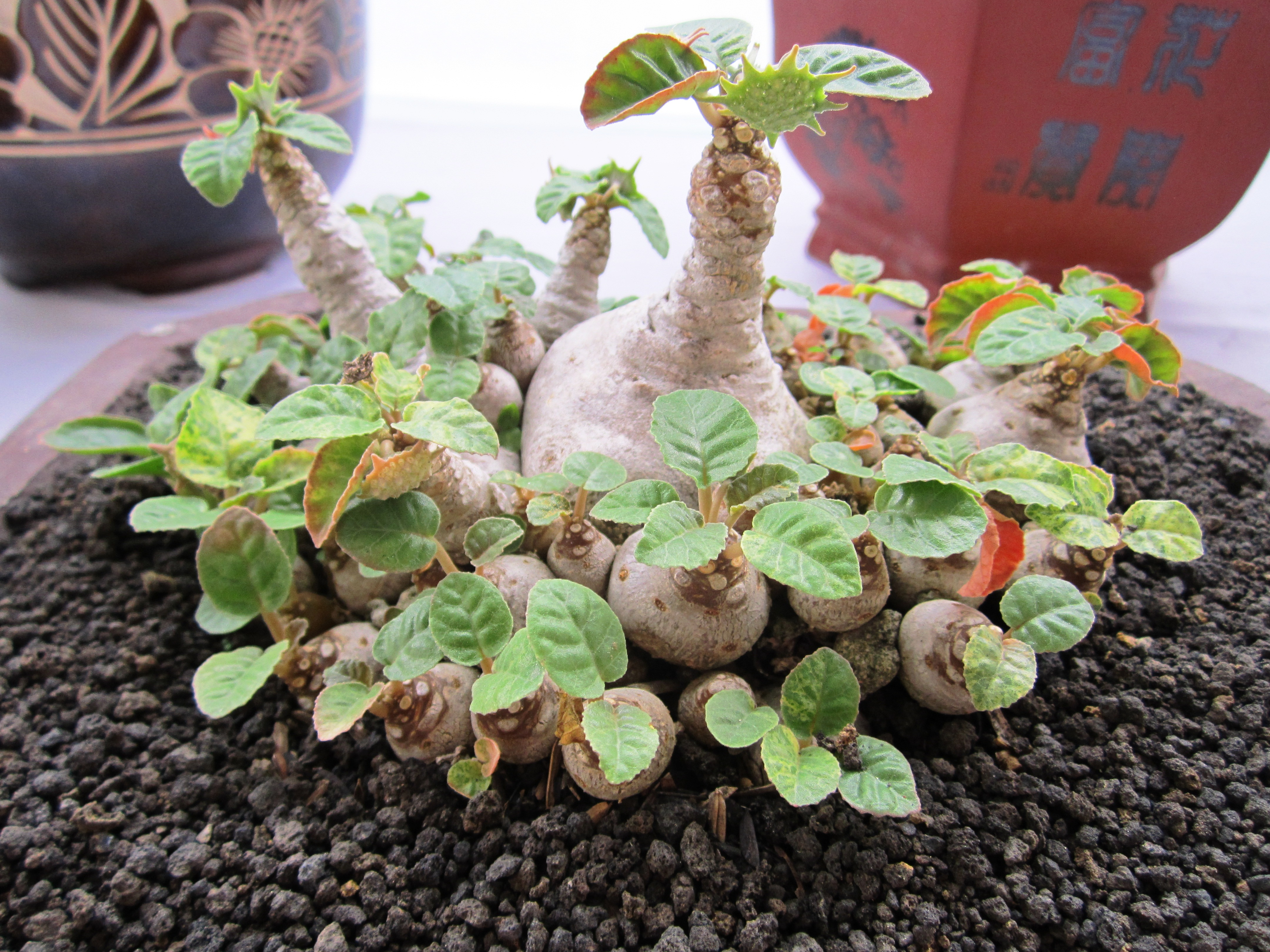
- Dorstenia foetida variegated

Scientific classification
- Kingdom: Plantae
- Clade: Tracheophytes
- Clade: Angiosperms
- Clade: Eudicots
- Clade: Rosids
- Order: Rosales
- Family: Moraceae
- Genus: Dorstenia
- Species: D. foetida

Binomial name
- Dorstenia foetida Schweinf.

= Dorstenia foetida =

Species of flowering plant

Dorstenia foetida, also known as grendelion, is a succulent plant in the genus Dorstenia, which is native to Eastern Africa and Arabia. It is a very variable species with a wide distribution.

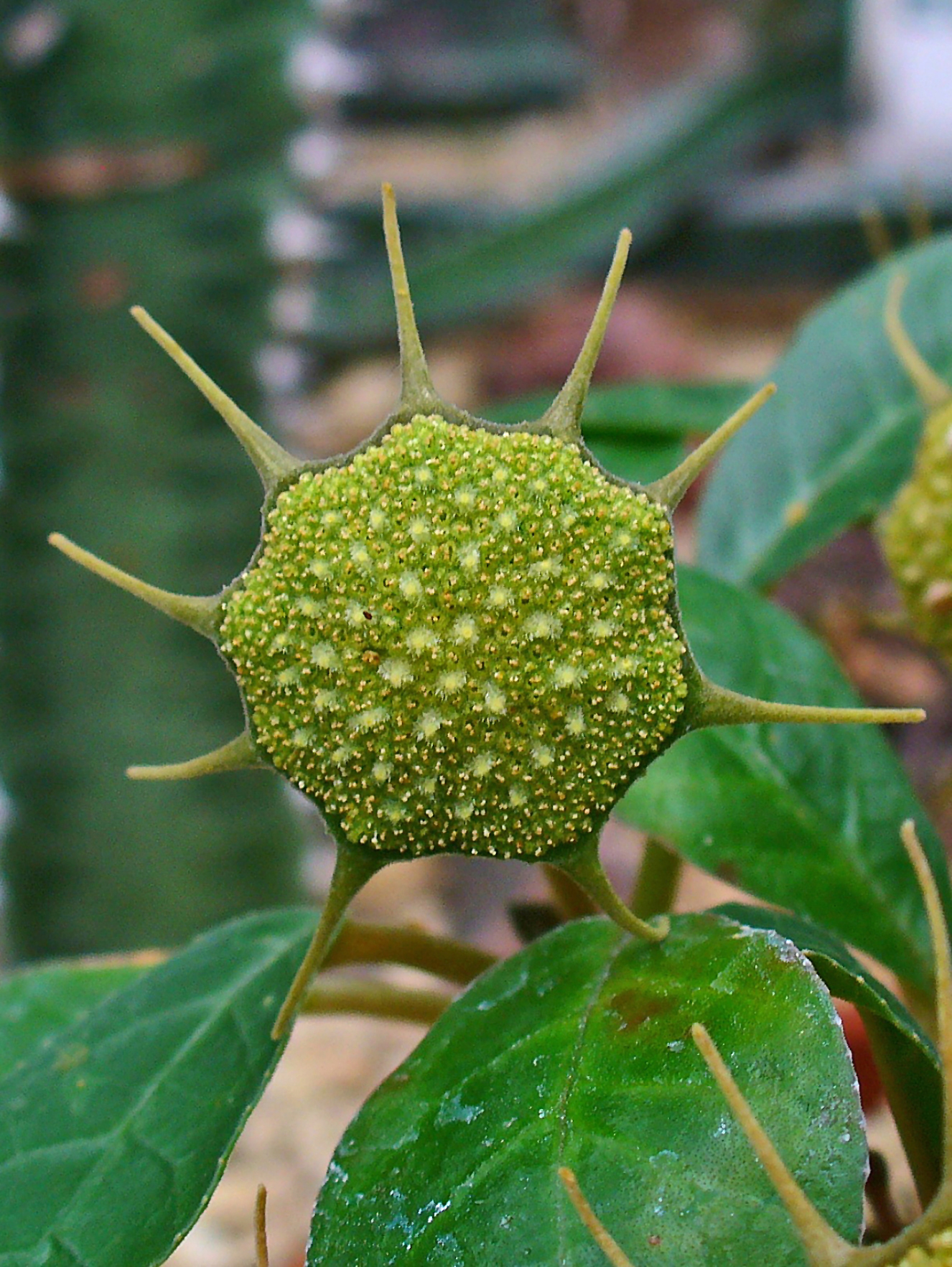
Dorstenia foetida, reproductive structure.

== Description ==
A very variable species especially in shape and size of leaves, and length of petioles and stipules. It is a perennial, evergreen or caducous sub-shrub. Stem succulent, may be branched or not. Stem a thick, dark green- to mahogany-colored conical trunk, up to 15 centimeters in diameter and 30–40 centimeters in height, older parts often with peeling bark. The stem bears conspicuous and prominent round scars of petioles, inflorescences and stipules in a spiral pattern. Branches nearly as thick as the stem, up to 1–1.5 cm thick and up to 15 cm tall, with pronounced markings of leaf-, inflorescence- and stipule-scars. Leaves alternate, crowded at the top of stems and branches; stipules subulate from a broad base, 1–2 mm long, mostly long persistent; petiole 1–3.6 cm long, puberulous; blade lanceolate to ovate, obovate or elliptic, 1.8–18 x 1–2.5 cm, cuneate to rounded at the base, rounded, obtuse or acuminate at the apex, with entire, crenulate, crisp or denticulate margins, scabridulous above, sparsely puberulous below. Flower structures grayish or green (or orange/pinkish). Receptacles 1–3 together in the leaf axils, on peduncles 1–6 cm long, circular in outline, 0.6–1.5 cm in diam. (excl. appendages), appendages 7–10, linear, up to 1.5 cm long. Male flowers numerous, tepals 2, stamens 2, rudimentary ovary inconspicuous. Female flowers numerous, scattered on the upper surface of the receptacle, stigma unbranched. Fruit with elongated, minutely tuberculate, pale brown endocarp, 1–1.4 mm long. The seed pods sunk in the receptacles open explosively when ripe and send the seed flying a considerable distance.

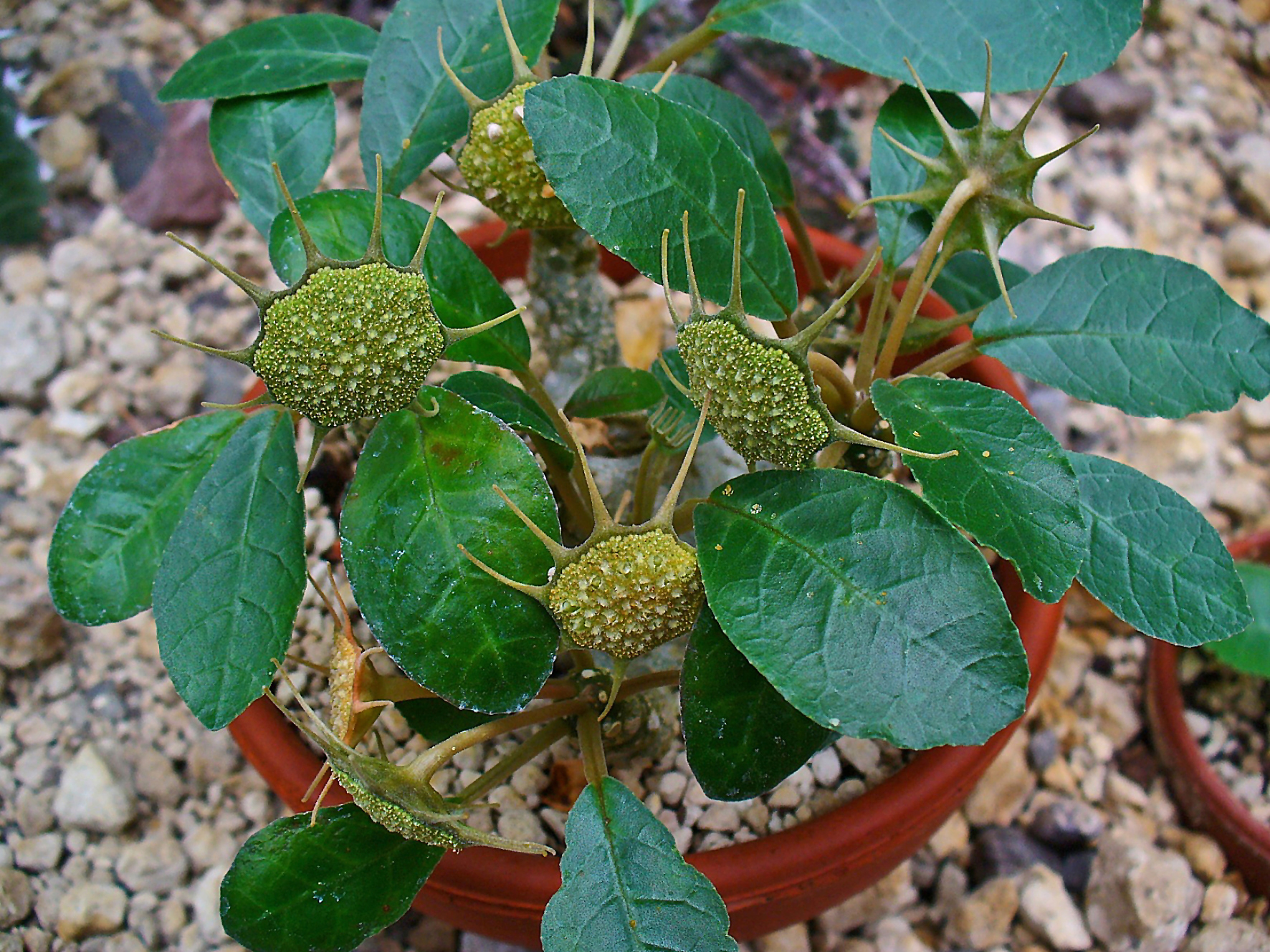
Dorstenia foetida

== Distribution ==
Ethiopia, Somalia, Kenya, Tanzania, Saudi Arabia, Yemen and Oman.

== Habitat ==
Deciduous and succulent bushland, open places, and on rock outcrops.

== Uses ==
In Oman the tubers of Dorstenia foetida are cooked and eaten.
