= Dorstenia tenuis =

Scientific classification
- Kingdom: Plantae
- Clade: Tracheophytes
- Clade: Angiosperms
- Clade: Eudicots
- Clade: Rosids
- Order: Rosales
- Family: Moraceae
- Genus: Dorstenia
- Species: D. tenuis

Binomial name
- Dorstenia tenuis Bonpl. ex Bureau

Species of flowering plant

Dorstenia tenuis is a species of herb in the plant family Moraceae which is native to southern South America.
