= Dorstenia jamaicensis =

Scientific classification
- Kingdom: Plantae
- Clade: Tracheophytes
- Clade: Angiosperms
- Clade: Eudicots
- Clade: Rosids
- Order: Rosales
- Family: Moraceae
- Genus: Dorstenia
- Species: D. jamaicensis

Binomial name
- Dorstenia jamaicensis Britton

Species of flowering plant

Dorstenia jamaicensis is a plant species in the family Moraceae.

It is endemic to Jamaica.
