= Dorstenia milaneziana =

Scientific classification
- Kingdom: Plantae
- Clade: Tracheophytes
- Clade: Angiosperms
- Clade: Eudicots
- Clade: Rosids
- Order: Rosales
- Family: Moraceae
- Genus: Dorstenia
- Species: D. milaneziana

Binomial name
- Dorstenia milaneziana Carauta, C.Valente & Sucre

Synonyms
- Dorstenia gracilis Carauta, C.Valente & D.S.D.Araujo

Species of flowering plant

Dorstenia milaneziana is a plant species in the family Moraceae which is native to eastern Brazil.
