= Dorstenia nummularia =

Scientific classification
- Kingdom: Plantae
- Clade: Tracheophytes
- Clade: Angiosperms
- Clade: Eudicots
- Clade: Rosids
- Order: Rosales
- Family: Moraceae
- Genus: Dorstenia
- Species: D. nummularia

Binomial name
- Dorstenia nummularia Urb. & Ekman

Synonyms
- Dorstenia ekmanii Urb.

Species of flowering plant

Dorstenia nummularia is a plant species in the family Moraceae which is native to Cuba.
