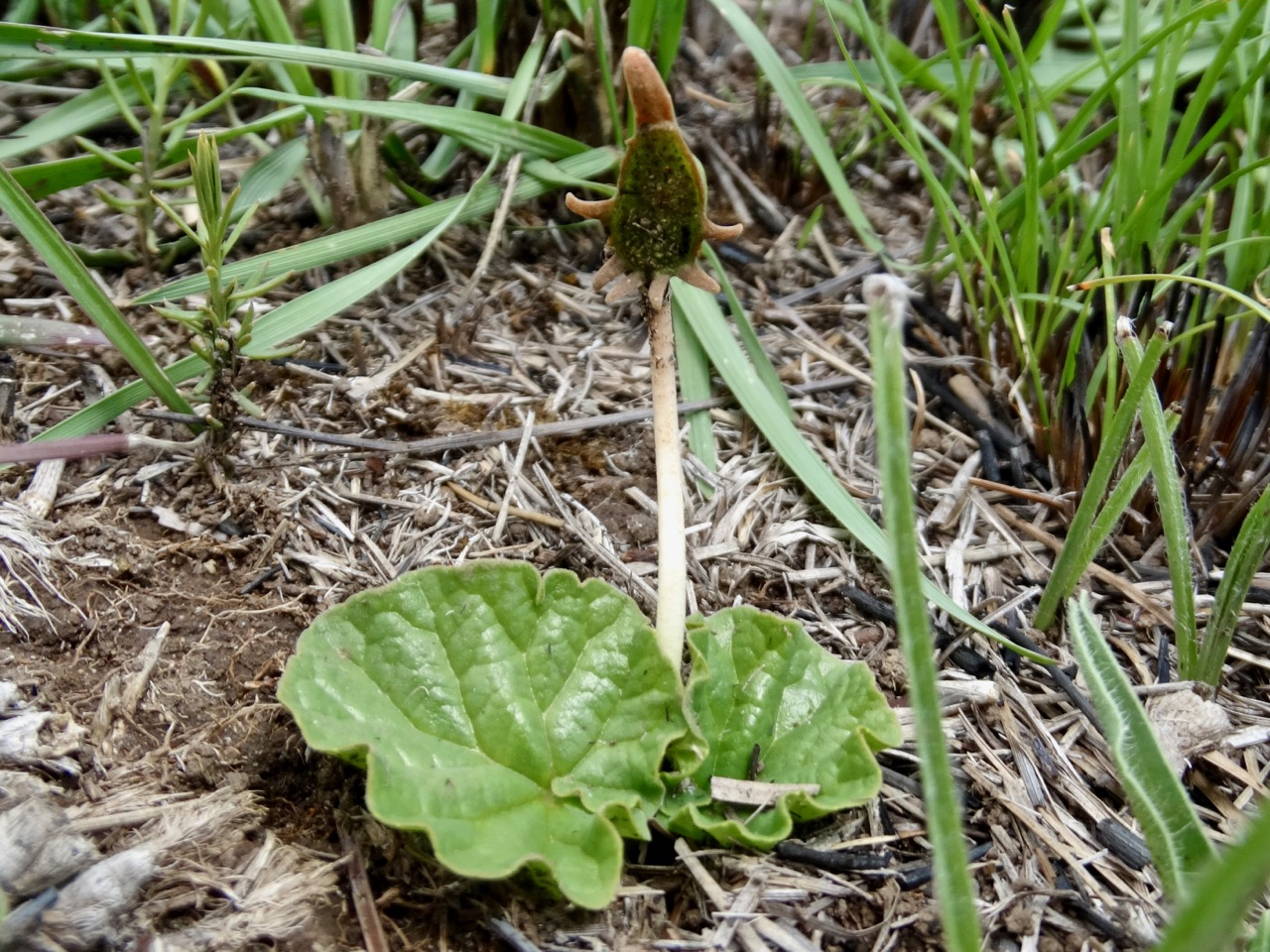
- At Ragati near Nanyuki, Kenya

Scientific classification
- Kingdom: Plantae
- Clade: Tracheophytes
- Clade: Angiosperms
- Clade: Eudicots
- Clade: Rosids
- Order: Rosales
- Family: Moraceae
- Genus: Dorstenia
- Species: D. barnimiana

Binomial name
- Dorstenia barnimiana Schweinf.

= Dorstenia barnimiana =

Species of plant

Dorstenia barnimiana is a very small tuberous succulent native widely across tropical Africa from Cameroon east to Zambia, and also in the southern Arabian Peninsula in Yemen.

The variety D. b. var. tropaeolifolia, found across most of the species' area, is the smallest known member of the family Moraceae. It has a single peltate leaf 3 cm (1.2 in) diameter springing from a tiny tuber 16 mm thick, with the leaf's petiole being 4 cm (1.6 in) height. As with other Dorstenia species, the tiny flowers coat the upper surface of a disk-like inflorescence.
