= Dorstenia hildegardis =

Scientific classification
- Kingdom: Plantae
- Clade: Tracheophytes
- Clade: Angiosperms
- Clade: Eudicots
- Clade: Rosids
- Order: Rosales
- Family: Moraceae
- Genus: Dorstenia
- Species: D. hildegardis

Binomial name
- Dorstenia hildegardis Carauta, C.Valente & O.M.Barth

Species of flowering plant

Dorstenia hildegardis is a plant species in the family Moraceae which is native to eastern Brazil.
