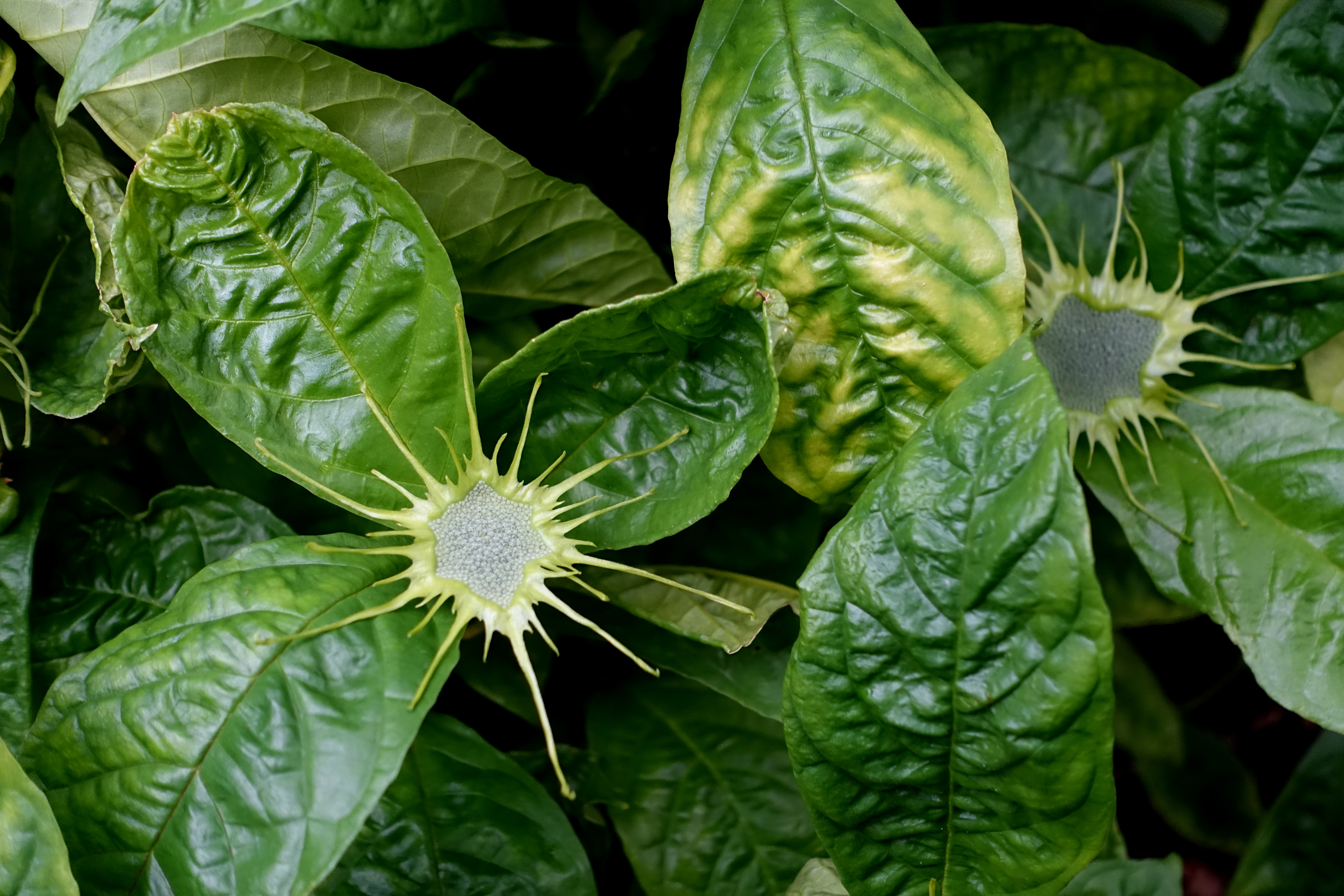
- Dorstenia barteri var. multiradiata

Scientific classification
- Kingdom: Plantae
- Clade: Tracheophytes
- Clade: Angiosperms
- Clade: Eudicots
- Clade: Rosids
- Order: Rosales
- Family: Moraceae
- Genus: Dorstenia
- Species: D. barteri

Binomial name
- Dorstenia barteri Bureau

= Dorstenia barteri =

Species of flowering plant

Dorstenia barteri is a West African plant species belonging to the family Moraceae.

== Description ==
A herb, 60 cm high, with a creeping rooting base. Stem erect, somewhat fleshy, subflexuous, pubescent to tomentose in the upper portion, up to 5 cm thick in the lower portion. Leaves papery when dry, obovate-elliptic to elliptic, shortly acuminate, narrowing to an obtuse base, margin entire or wavy, 14–18 cm long, 5–8 cm wide, glabrous, paler green beneath; lateral nerves 8–10 on each side, curving upwards and uniting within the margin, prominent beneath; petiole more or less pubescent, about 1.2 cm or less in length. Stipules subulate, 5–6 cm or less in length, generally falling before the leaves. Inflorescence solitary in the upper leaf-axils; stalk 1.2– 2 cm long, puberulous; receptacle flattened or somewhat convex, orbicular, 2.5–4.5 cm in diameter, including the broad membranous margin (7–10 cm wide), which is prolonged into numerous (about 15) very unequal bract-arms, a few from 1.2– 2 cm long, the remainder short, from 2.5 to 7.5 cm long. Flowers very distinct. Male flowers 3-merous, the 3 bluntly rounded perianth-lobes depressed on the surface of the disc. Female perianth ring-like, raised above the disc-surface, the deeply 2-fid style projecting from the mouth. Endocarp of fruit subglobose, smooth, whitish brown, 4 cm in diameter.

== Medicinal uses ==
Dorstenia barteri is used in West African folk medicine. It contains numerous flavonoid compounds that have anti-microbial, anti-reverse transcriptase, and anti-inflammatory effects.
