= Dorstenia peltata =

Scientific classification
- Kingdom: Plantae
- Clade: Tracheophytes
- Clade: Angiosperms
- Clade: Eudicots
- Clade: Rosids
- Order: Rosales
- Family: Moraceae
- Genus: Dorstenia
- Species: D. peltata

Binomial name
- Dorstenia peltata Spreng.

Synonyms
- Dorstenia crassipes Griseb.

Species of flowering plant

Dorstenia peltata is a plant species in the family Moraceae which is native to the Dominican Republic and Cuba.
