= Dorstenia fawcettii =

Scientific classification
- Kingdom: Plantae
- Clade: Tracheophytes
- Clade: Angiosperms
- Clade: Eudicots
- Clade: Rosids
- Order: Rosales
- Family: Moraceae
- Genus: Dorstenia
- Species: D. fawcettii

Binomial name
- Dorstenia fawcettii Urb.

Synonyms
- Dorstenia marginata Urb. & Ekman; Dorstenia haitensis Rossberg

Species of flowering plant

Dorstenia fawcettii is a plant species in the family Moraceae which is native to Jamaica and Haiti.
