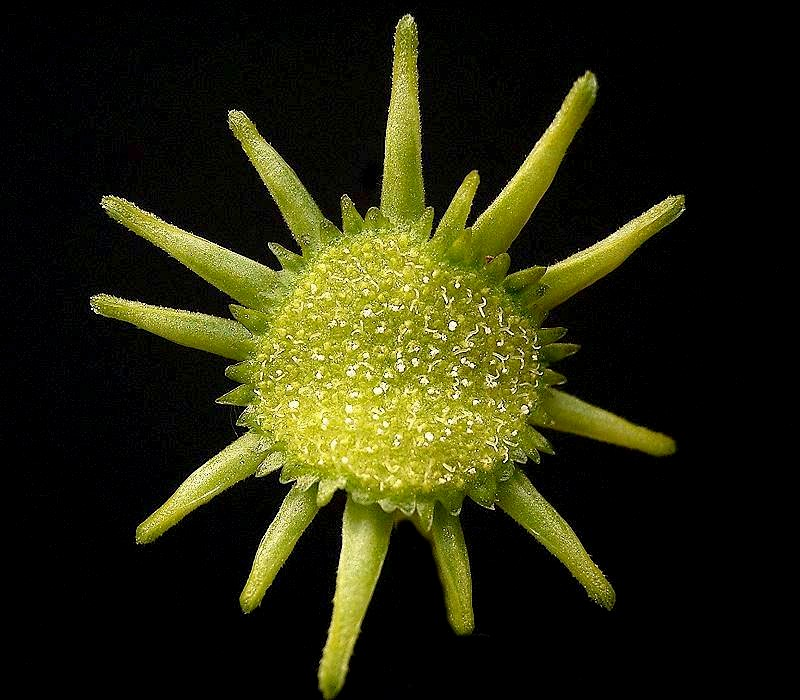
- Pseudanthium of Dorstenia hildebrandtii

Scientific classification
- Kingdom: Plantae
- Clade: Tracheophytes
- Clade: Angiosperms
- Clade: Eudicots
- Clade: Rosids
- Order: Rosales
- Family: Moraceae
- Tribe: Dorstenieae
- Genus: Dorstenia; Plum. ex L. (1753)

Species
- 122; see text

Synonyms
- Craterogyne Lanj. (1935); Ctenocladium Airy Shaw (1965); Ctenocladus Engl. (1921), nom. illeg.; Kosaria Forssk. (1775); Sychinium Desv. (1826)

= Dorstenia =

Genus of flowering plants

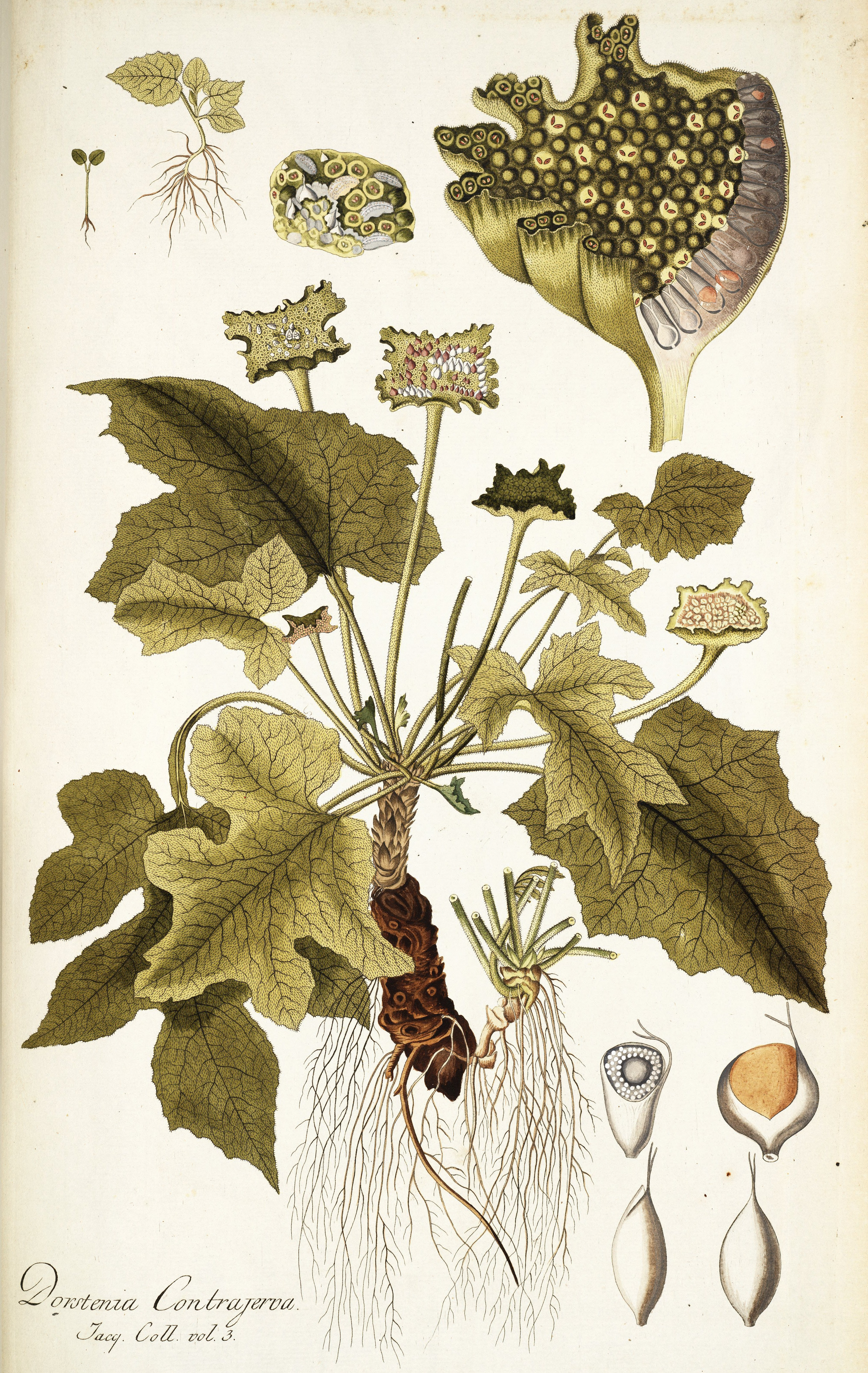
Dorstenia contrajerva, the type species, by von Jacquin, 1793.

Dorstenia is a genus within the mulberry family, Moraceae. Depending on the author, there are said to be 100 to 170 species within this genus, second only in number to the genus Ficus within Moraceae. Plants of the World Online currently accepts 122 species. Dorstenia species are mainly known for their unusual inflorescences and growth habits. Dorstenia is named in honor of the German physician and botanist Theodor Dorsten (1492–1552). The type species is Dorstenia contrajerva.

== Growth habit ==
Dorstenia is unique in the family Moraceae because of the extremely diverse growth habits and forms of its species. While the majority of Moraceae are woody perennials, Dorstenia species are predominantly herbaceous, succulent, or suffrutescent perennials. Only 10% exhibit the typical woody habit of the Moraceae.

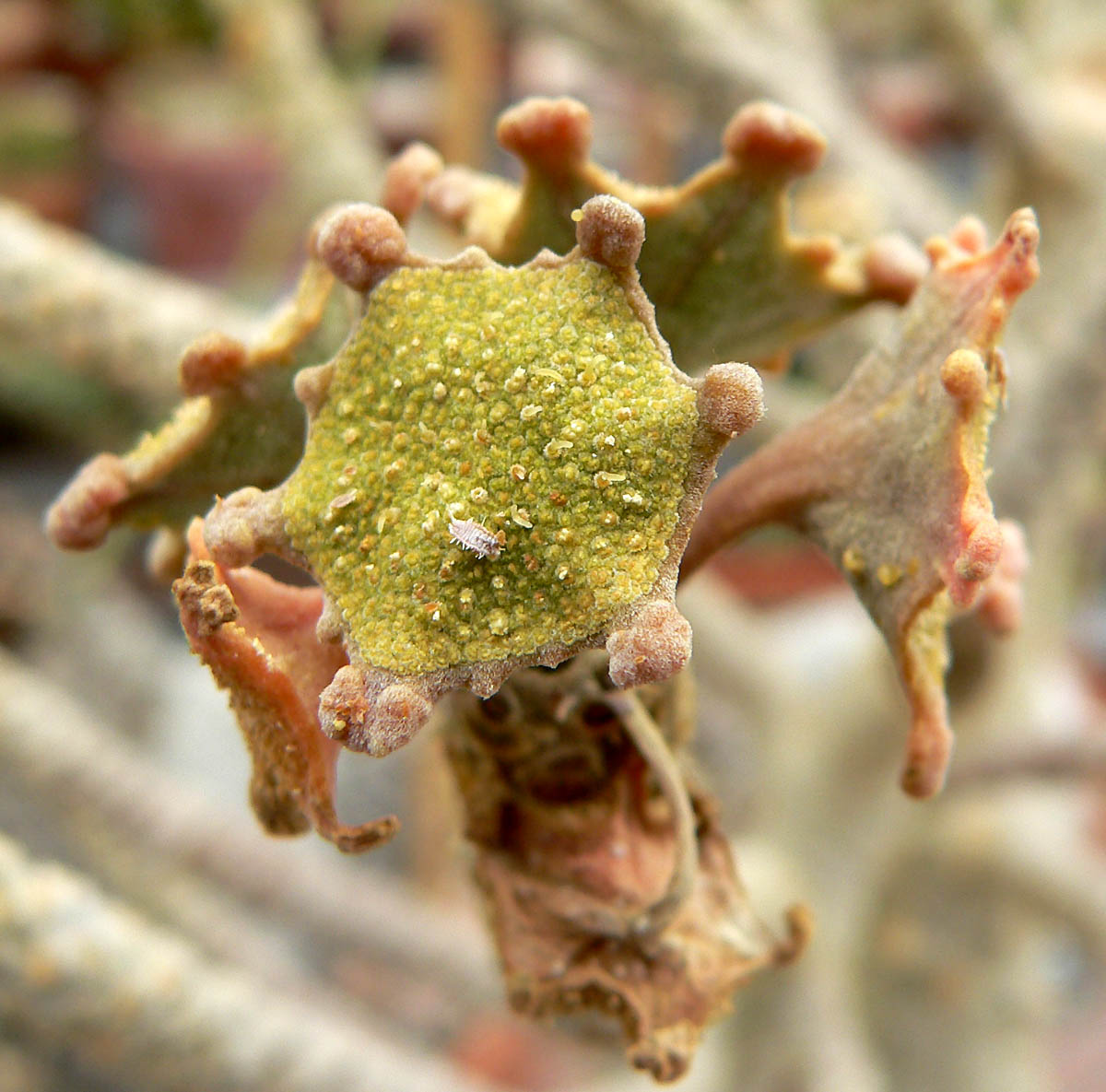
Dorstenia gigas from Socotra.

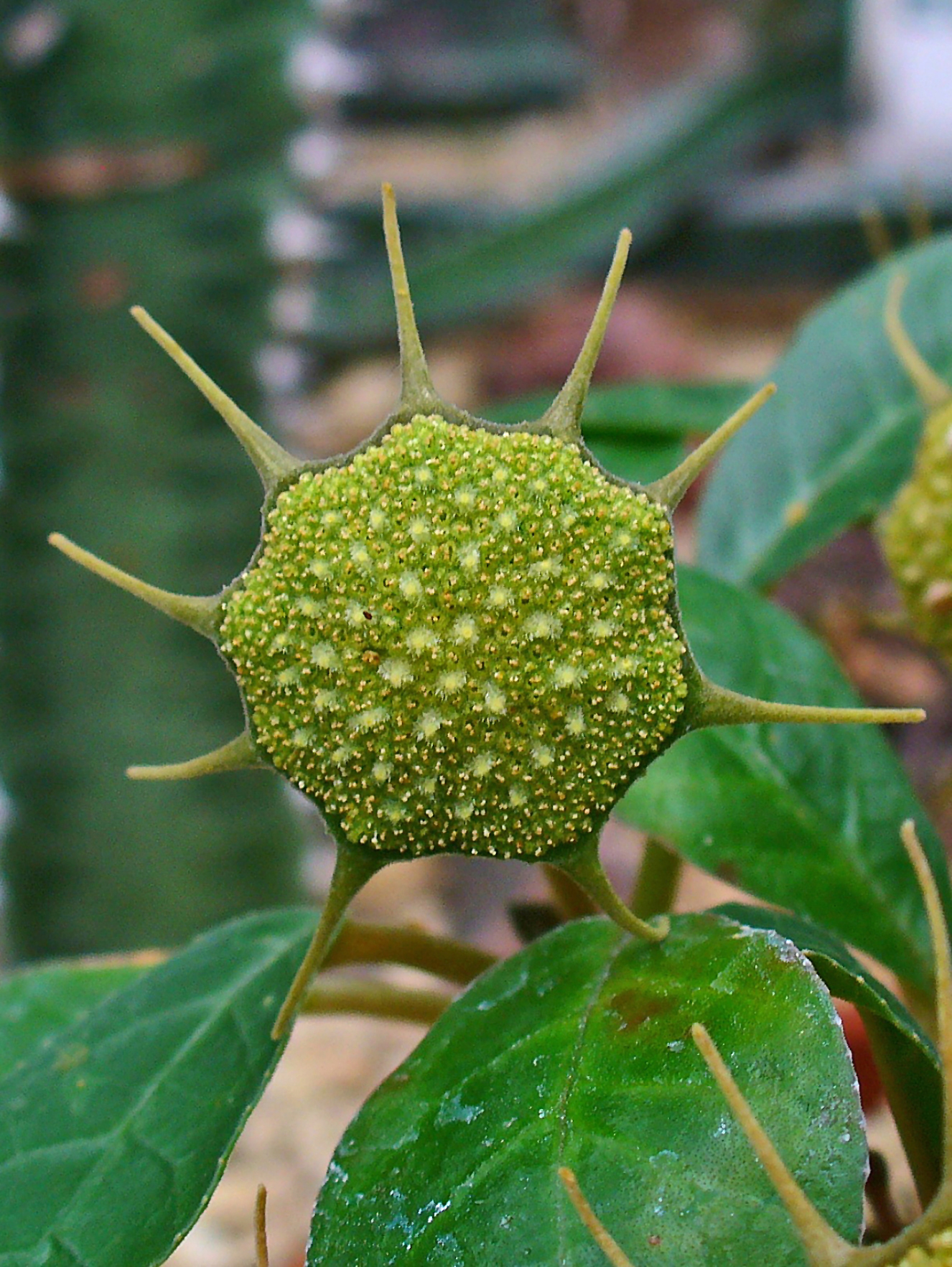
Dorstenia foetida from East Africa and Arabia.

The spectrum of the genus Dorstenia ranges from small annuals to perennial herbaceous plants with and without rhizomes or tubers, geophytes, lithophytes, epiphytes, woody shrubs and succulents (stem or leaf succulents). Their juice is mostly milky white, rarely yellow or colorless. The hairs that are found on most species are at least partially hook-shaped.

The leaves mostly are arranged in spirals and rosettes, and rarely as two-rowed leaves. The leaf blades may be shield-, hand- or foot-shaped, whole, incised, lobed or feathered. Usually the leaf edges are perforated or notched. The ever-present stipulae are also variable in shape. Usually they are leathery, sometimes large, leaf-like and durable or sometimes small, awl-shaped and quickly falling off.

=== Reproductive structure and fruits ===
The most striking characteristic of Dorstenia is their reproductive structure, called pseudanthium (Greek for "false flower") or in Moraceae hypanthium, which is composed of clusters of tiny unisexual flowers on a disc- or cup-shaped receptacle that are often adorned with bracts of various sizes and shapes. The pseudanthiums can be planar, convex, concave, round, oval, square, lobed, twig, star, boot, or tongue-shaped. Their color varies from green to yellowish and reddish to violet and brown. Beneath the pseudanthium, there are usually bracts, scattered or in rows, sometimes carrying appendages. Sometimes the bracts are absent and only their remaining tooth-shaped, awl-like, spatula-shaped or band-shaped appendages are recognizable.

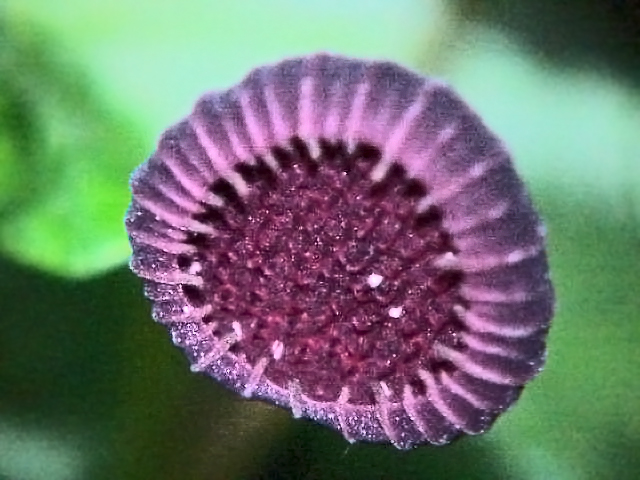
Dorstenia urceolata from Brazil.

The globular, tapered, or warty flowers are unisexual. The female flowers within the receptacle mature first. The male flowers are either scattered between the female flowers or are concentrated on the outer edge of the receptacle or are separated by a flower-free zone at the outer edge. They are stalked and carry one to four (usually two to three) free or almost free tepals and one to four (usually two to three) stamens. The sunken female flowers carry tubular tepals and a free fruit node with one or two, then mostly unequal scars. Like most members of the Moraceae, Dorstenia species have drupe-like fruits that are embedded in the receptacle. However, a special feature of Dorstenia drupes is that they explode to release and scatter the seeds by way of a centrifugal mechanism. The seed is squeezed by the surrounding tissue in the manner of a watermelon seed being pinched by a finger and thumb. The stone seeds are usually small with a minuscule endosperm.

== Taxonomy ==
Dorstenia is part of the tribe Dorstenieae of the family Moraceae, and all three levels of classification are monophyletic from chloroplast and nuclear DNA phylogenies, with morphological characters that also support. The family Moraceae is a part of the monophyletic order Rosales, and within this order Moraceae is most closely related to the plant families Ulmaceae, Cannabaceae, and Urticaceae.

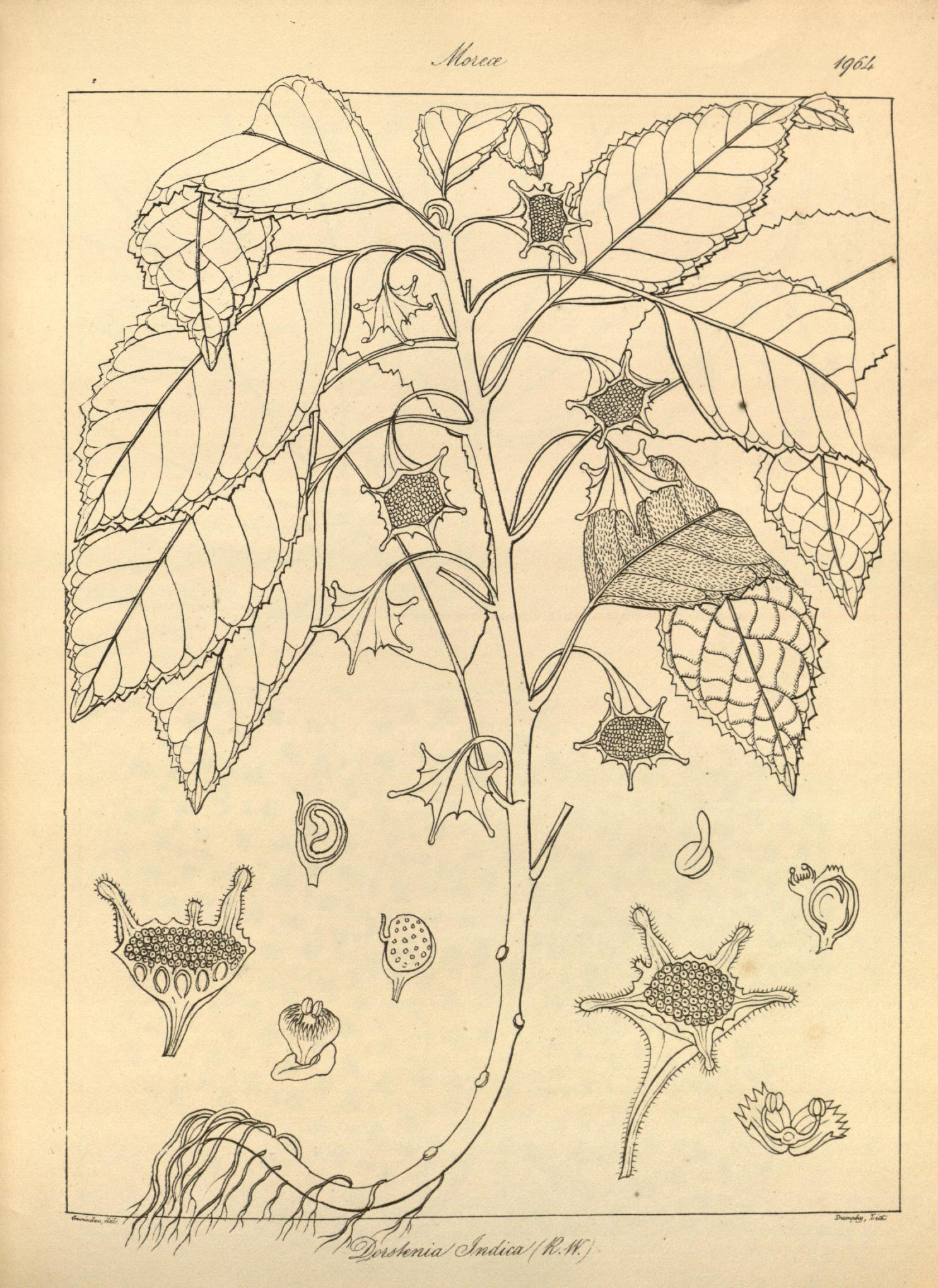
Dorstenia indica from South India and Sri Lanka

=== Evolution ===
Fossils of Ficus and Morus fruits have been found on the African continent, and are used to approximate the origin of the family Moraceae to a maximum of 135 million years ago. In a recent study using fossil fruits, Bayesian molecular dating, and maximum likelihood, researchers attempted to reconstruct the ancestral history of Dorstenia with ITS (internal transcribed spacer) sequences from ribosomal DNA of 35 Dorstenia species and seven out-group species from the different tribes within the Moraceae. The goal was to resolve a long-standing issue regarding Dorstenia; whether this genus diverged and radiated prior to the split of Africa and South America about 105 mya, and members of this genus are on separate continents by vicariance, or if this genus diverged post-split and Dorstenia became established in the Neotropics by seed dispersal.

This study produced a phylogeny indicating an initial Old World divergence around 112.3 mya, divergence and radiance of New World Dorstenia at 67.2 and 30.3 mya respectively, and an Old World group nested within the New World that radiated around 13.6 mya. The results of this phylogeny do not reveal whether vicariance or seed dispersal explains the biogeography; however, due to the small endosperm that is typical of Dorstenia seeds, it is unlikely that seed dispersal by animals is the reason for the New World and reemerged Old World species. The pattern seen does suggest several hypotheses regarding how the New World lineage came about as well as how three Old World Dorstenia species are nested in the New World clade. It is theorized that the New World lineage crossed over via Asia and then Beringia, established populations all throughout the North and South Americas, and when climate conditions changed (and North America was no longer tropical or subtropical), that the North American populations died out, leaving only those in South America. This idea also theoretically allows for Old World species nested within the New World lineage, with Dorstenia populations established in America returning to Africa via Beringia while climatic conditions were still favorable. For this hypothesis to receive more credence, fossil Dorstenia plants in North America would be needed.

== Distribution and habitat ==
The species are fairly equally distributed between the Afrotropics and Neotropics. Only one species grows east of Arabia, in the tropical forests of Southern India and Sri Lanka.

== Uses ==
South American species such as Dorstenia contrajerva and Dorstenia brasiliensis are a source of the herbal preparation contrayerva that has been used as a tonic and febrifuge, and as an antidote in South American folk medicine. In North America powder made from the rootstocks and leaves of Dorstenia contrajerva is mixed with tobacco for improving the taste of cigarettes. In Oman the tubers of Dorstenia foetida are cooked and eaten. Dorstenia barteri is used in West African folk medicine. Scientific research has shown that it contains numerous flavonoid compounds that have anti-microbial, anti-reverse transcriptase, and anti-inflammatory effects.

== Species ==
In the past many species were described that are now considered synonyms. This is due to the great variability of many Dorstenia species. New species are still discovered, such as Dorstenia luamensis a hanging lithophyte from Congo, first described in 2014. The following list includes species accepted by Plants of the World Online.

- Dorstenia acangatara M.D.M.Vianna, Al.Santos, A.F.P.Machado, Mansano & Romaniuc
- Dorstenia africana (Baill.) C.C.Berg
- Dorstenia afromontana R.E.Fr.
- Dorstenia albertii Carauta, C.Valente & Sucre
- Dorstenia annua Friis & Vollesen
- Dorstenia appendiculata Miq.
- Dorstenia arachniformis Matheka, Malombe, T.Mwadime & Mwachala
- Dorstenia arifolia Lam.
- Dorstenia aristeguietae Cuatrec.
- Dorstenia astyanactis Aké Assi
- Dorstenia bahiensis Klotzsch ex Fisch. & C.A.Mey.
- Dorstenia barnimiana Schweinf.
- Dorstenia barteri Bureau
- Dorstenia belizensis C.C.Berg
- Dorstenia benguellensis Welw.
- Dorstenia bergiana Hijman
- Dorstenia bicaudata Peter
- Dorstenia bonijesu Carauta & C.Valente
- Dorstenia bowmanniana Baker
- Dorstenia brasiliensis Lam.
- Dorstenia brevipetiolata C.C.Berg
- Dorstenia brownii Rendle
- Dorstenia buchananii Engl.
- Dorstenia caatingae R.M.Castro
- Dorstenia caimitensis Urb.
- Dorstenia carautae C.C.Berg
- Dorstenia cayapia Vell.
- Dorstenia choconiana S.Watson
- Dorstenia christenhuszii M.W.Chase & M.F.Fay
- Dorstenia ciliata Engl.
- Dorstenia colombiana Cuatrec.
- Dorstenia conceptionis Carauta
- Dorstenia contensis Carauta & C.C.Berg
- Dorstenia contrajerva L.
- Dorstenia convexa De Wild.
- Dorstenia crenulata C.Wright ex Griseb.
- Dorstenia cuspidata Hochst.
- Dorstenia dinklagei Engl.
- Dorstenia dionga Engl.
- Dorstenia djettii Guillaumet
- Dorstenia dorstenioides (Engl.) Hijman & C.C.Berg
- Dorstenia drakena L.
- Dorstenia elata Gardner
- Dorstenia ellenbeckiana Engl.
- Dorstenia elliptica Bureau
- Dorstenia embergeri Mangenot
- Dorstenia erythrantha C.Wright ex Griseb.
- Dorstenia excentrica Moric.
- Dorstenia fawcettii Urb.
- Dorstenia flagellifera Urb. & Ekman
- Dorstenia foetida Schweinf.
- Dorstenia gigas Schweinf. ex Balf.f.
- Dorstenia goetzei Engl.
- Dorstenia grazielae Carauta, C.Valente & Sucre
- Dorstenia gypsophila Lavranos
- Dorstenia hildebrandtii Engl.
- Dorstenia hildegardis Carauta, C.Valente & O.M.Barth
- Dorstenia hirta Desv.
- Dorstenia holstii Engl.
- Dorstenia horwoodii Rzepecky
- Dorstenia indica Wight
- Dorstenia involuta Hijman & C.C.Berg
- Dorstenia jamaicensis Britton
- Dorstenia kameruniana Engl.
- Dorstenia lanei R.A.Howard & W.R.Briggs
- Dorstenia lavrani T.A.McCoy & M.Massara
- Dorstenia letestui Pellegr.
- Dorstenia lindeniana Bureau
- Dorstenia luamensis M.E.Leal
- Dorstenia lujae De Wild.
- Dorstenia mannii Hook.f.
- Dorstenia mariae Carauta, J.M.Albuq. & R.M.Castro
- Dorstenia marijan-matokii Eb.Fisch. & Killmann
- Dorstenia milaneziana Carauta, C.Valente & Sucre
- Dorstenia nummularia Urb. & Ekman
- Dorstenia nyungwensis Troupin
- Dorstenia oligogyna (Pellegr.) C.C.Berg
- Dorstenia panamensis C.C.Berg
- Dorstenia paucibracteata De Wild.
- Dorstenia peltata Spreng.
- Dorstenia peruviana C.C.Berg
- Dorstenia petraea C.Wright ex Griseb.
- Dorstenia picta Bureau
- Dorstenia poinsettiifolia Engl.
- Dorstenia prorepens Engl.
- Dorstenia psilurus Welw.
- Dorstenia ramosa (Desv.) Carauta, C.Valente & Sucre
- Dorstenia renulata C.Wright ex Griseb.
- Dorstenia richardii Baill.
- Dorstenia rocana Britton
- Dorstenia roigii Britton
- Dorstenia romaniucii A.F.P.Machado & M.D.M.Vianna
- Dorstenia schliebenii Mildbr.
- Dorstenia setosa Moric.
- Dorstenia socotrana A.G.Mill.
- Dorstenia soerensenii Friis
- Dorstenia solheidii De Wild.
- Dorstenia stellaris Al.Santos & Romaniuc
- Dorstenia subdentata Hijman & C.C.Berg
- Dorstenia subrhombiformis Engl.
- Dorstenia tayloriana Rendle
- Dorstenia tenera Bureau
- Dorstenia tentaculata Fisch. & C.A.Mey.
- Dorstenia tenuiradiata Mildbr.
- Dorstenia tenuis Bonpl. ex Bureau
- Dorstenia tessmannii Engl.
- Dorstenia thikaensis Hijman
- Dorstenia triseriata A.F.P.Machado, Fontella & Carauta
- Dorstenia tuberosa C.Wright ex Griseb.
- Dorstenia turnerifolia Fisch. & C.A.Mey.
- Dorstenia ulugurensis Engl.
- Dorstenia umbricola A.C.Sm.
- Dorstenia urceolata Schott
- Dorstenia uxpanapana C.C.Berg & T.Wendt
- Dorstenia variifolia Engl.
- Dorstenia vivipara Welw.
- Dorstenia warneckei Engl.
- Dorstenia yambuyaensis De Wild.
- Dorstenia yangambiensis J.Léonard
- Dorstenia zambesiaca Hijman
- Dorstenia zanzibarica Oliv.
- Dorstenia zenkeri Engl.
