= Dorstenia urceolata =

Scientific classification
- Kingdom: Plantae
- Clade: Tracheophytes
- Clade: Angiosperms
- Clade: Eudicots
- Clade: Rosids
- Order: Rosales
- Family: Moraceae
- Genus: Dorstenia
- Species: D. urceolata

Binomial name
- Dorstenia urceolata Schott

Synonyms
- Dorstenia nervosa Desv. Dorstenia nervosa Desv. var. latifolia Desv. Dorstenia nervosa Desv. var. angustifolia Desv. Dorstenia caulescens Vellozo; Dorstenia caulescens Vellozo var. angustifolia Fielding & Gardner; Dorstenia caulescens Vellozo var. latifolia Fielding & Gardner; Dorstenia urceolata Schott var. variegata Bureau

Species of flowering plant

Dorstenia urceolata is a plant species in the family Moraceae which is native to eastern Brazil.
