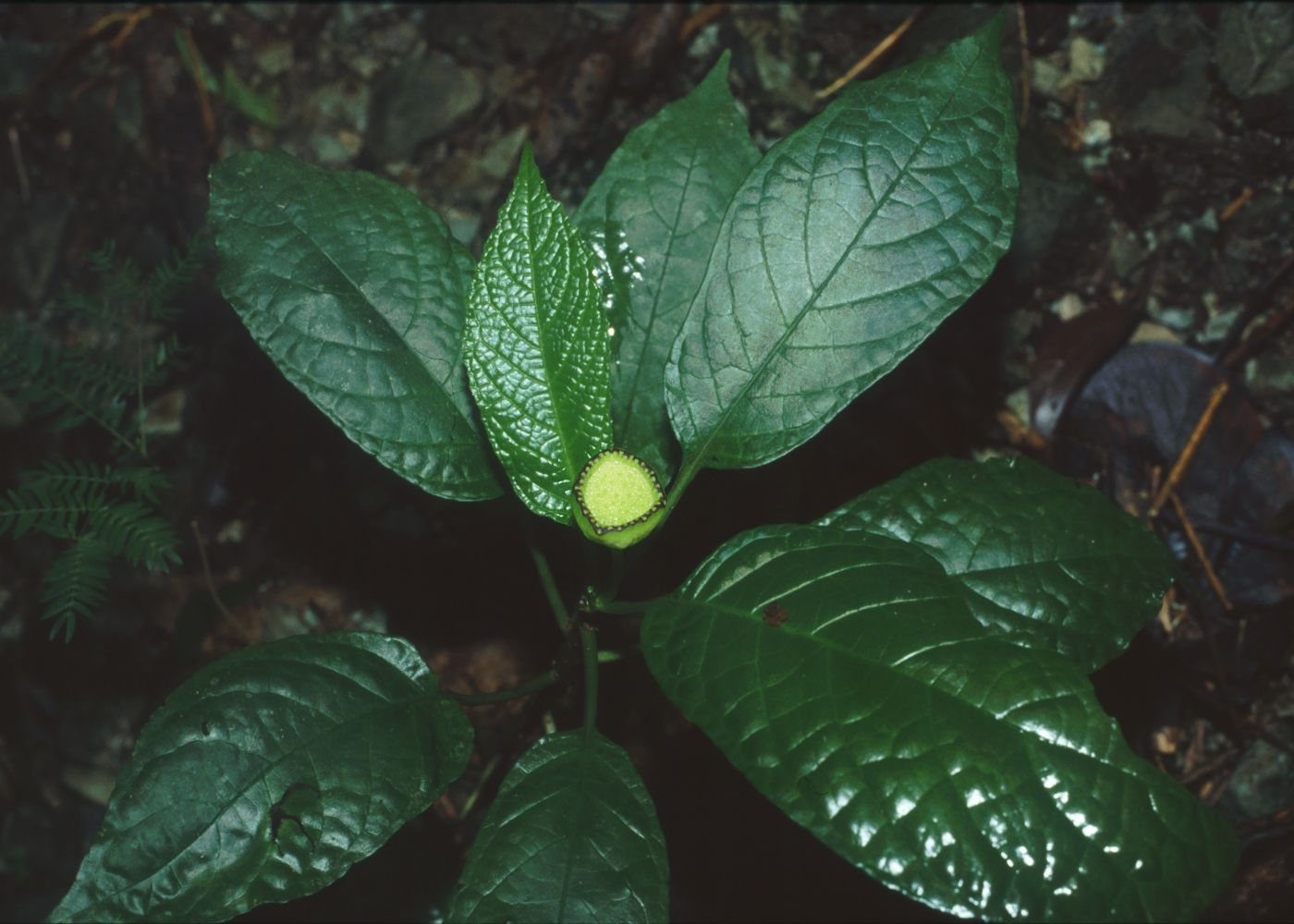

Scientific classification
- Kingdom: Plantae
- Clade: Tracheophytes
- Clade: Angiosperms
- Clade: Eudicots
- Clade: Rosids
- Order: Rosales
- Family: Moraceae
- Genus: Dorstenia
- Species: D. choconiana

Binomial name
- Dorstenia choconiana S.Watson

Synonyms
- Dorstenia choconiana var. integrifolia Donn.Sm. Dorstenia cordato-acuminata Cufod.

= Dorstenia choconiana =

Species of flowering plant

Dorstenia choconiana is a plant species in the family Moraceae which is native to Central America from Guatemala to Panama.
