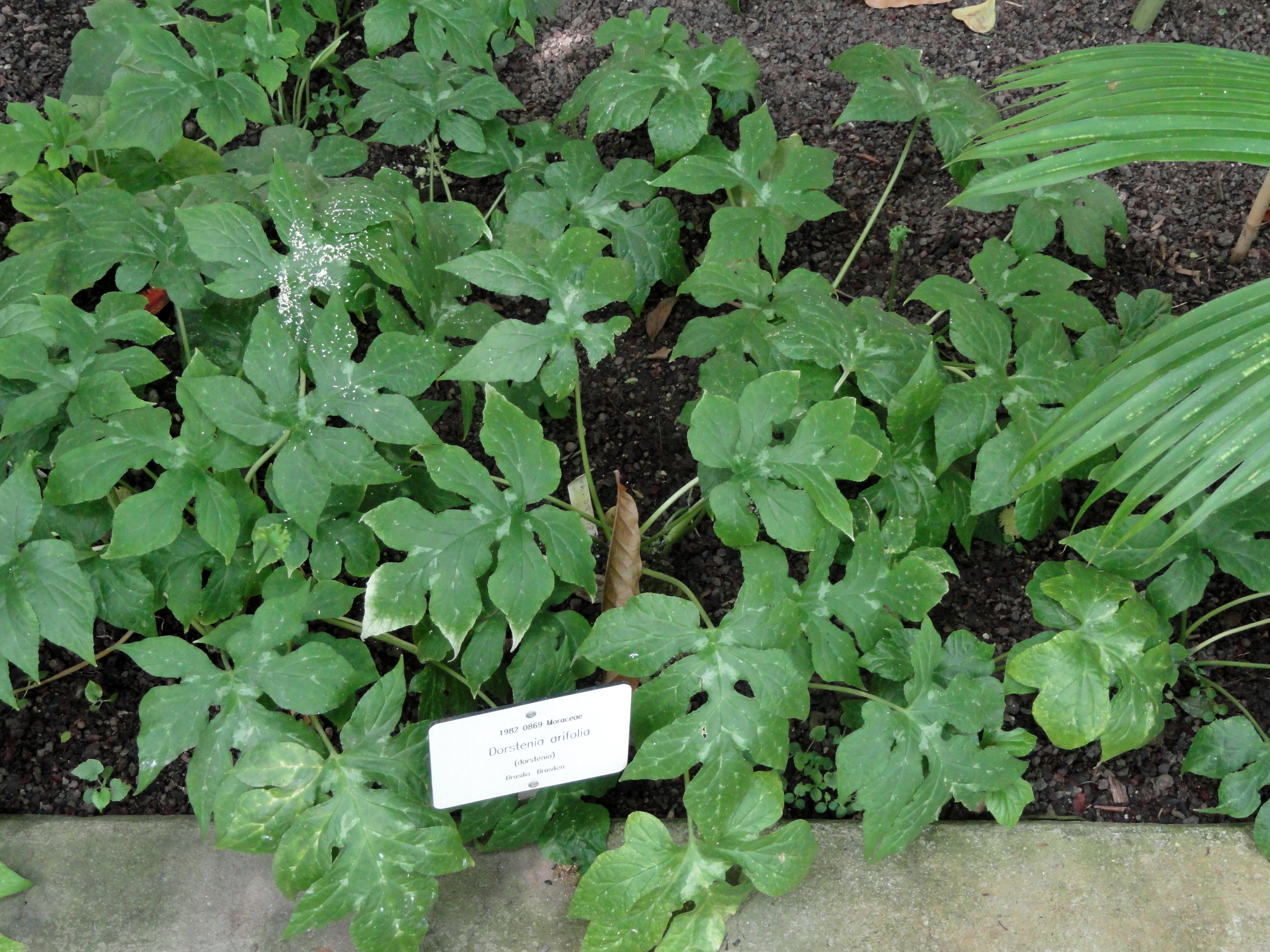
- Dorstenia arifolia at the University of Helsinki Botanical Garden at Kaisaniemi

Scientific classification
- Kingdom: Plantae
- Clade: Tracheophytes
- Clade: Angiosperms
- Clade: Eudicots
- Clade: Rosids
- Order: Rosales
- Family: Moraceae
- Genus: Dorstenia
- Species: D. arifolia

Binomial name
- Dorstenia arifolia Lam.

Synonyms
- Dorstenia multiformis Miq. var. arifolia (Lam.) Bureau; Dorstenia faria Paiva ex Spreng. Dorstenia quadrata Desv. Dorstenia cyperus Vell. Dorstenia ficifolia Fisch. & C.A.Mey. Dorstenia mandiocana Fisch. & C.A.Mey. Dorstenia tentaculata Fisch. & C.A.Mey. Dorstenia peltata Fisch. & C.A.Mey. Dorstenia multiformis Miq. Dorstenia strangii Carauta; Dorstenia maris C.Valente & Carauta

= Dorstenia arifolia =

Species of flowering plant

Dorstenia arifolia is a plant species in the family Moraceae which is native to eastern Brazil.
