= Theodor Dorsten =

German botanist and physician

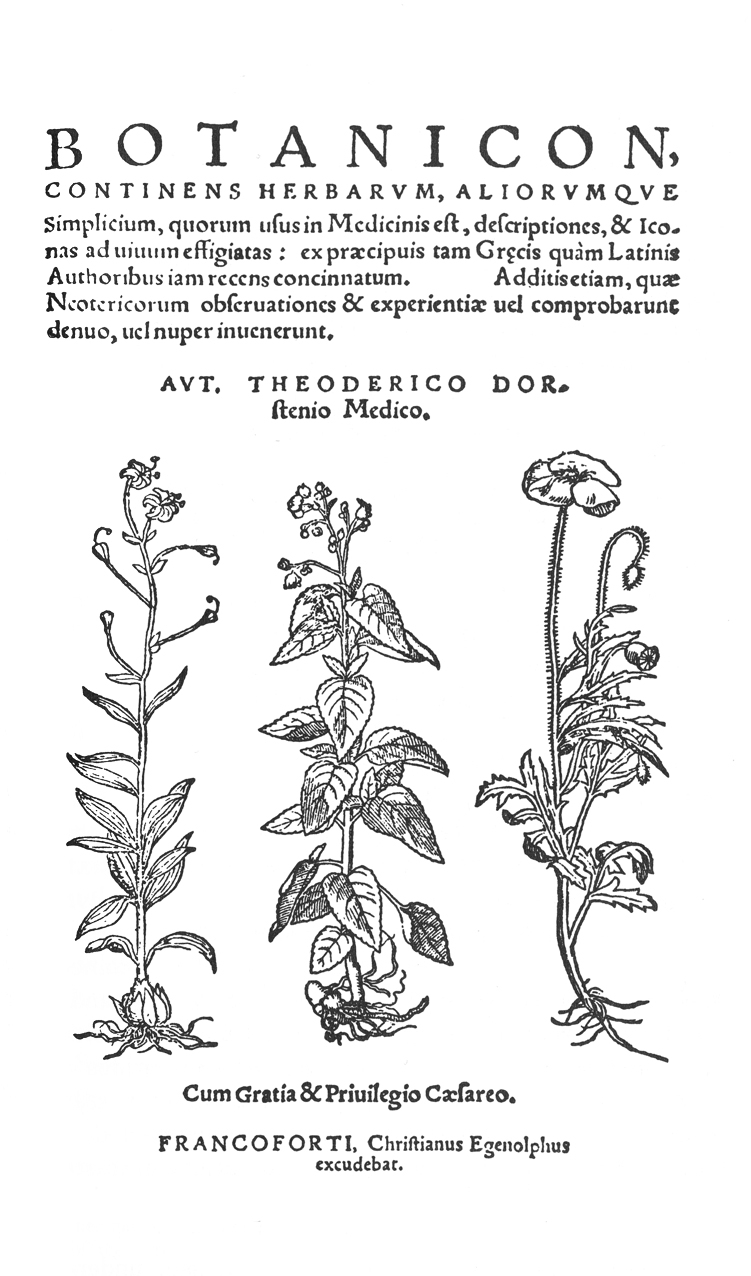
Botanicon of Theodor Dorsten.

Theodor Dorsten (Latin:Theodoricus Dorstenius) (Dorsten, 1492-Kassel, 18 May 1552) was a German botanist and physician. The genus Dorstenia was named in his honor, a name later used by used by Carl Linnaeus and others.

== Life ==
He studied in University of Erfurt and later became a professor at University of Marburg. He wrote Botanicon in 1540. Dorsten did not use his family name Gluntius in his publications.
