= Dorstenia petraea =

Scientific classification
- Kingdom: Plantae
- Clade: Tracheophytes
- Clade: Angiosperms
- Clade: Eudicots
- Clade: Rosids
- Order: Rosales
- Family: Moraceae
- Genus: Dorstenia
- Species: D. petraea

Binomial name
- Dorstenia petraea Griseb.

Species of flowering plant

Dorstenia petraea is a species of flowering plant in the family Moraceae. It is native to eastern Cuba.
