= Dorstenia bowmanniana =

Scientific classification
- Kingdom: Plantae
- Clade: Tracheophytes
- Clade: Angiosperms
- Clade: Eudicots
- Clade: Rosids
- Order: Rosales
- Family: Moraceae
- Genus: Dorstenia
- Species: D. bowmanianna

Binomial name
- Dorstenia bowmanianna Baker

Synonyms
- Dorstenia lagoensis Bureau

Species of flowering plant

Dorstenia bowmanniana is a species of plant in the family Moraceae. It is native to eastern Brazil.
