= Dorstenia umbricola =

Scientific classification
- Kingdom: Plantae
- Clade: Tracheophytes
- Clade: Angiosperms
- Clade: Eudicots
- Clade: Rosids
- Order: Rosales
- Family: Moraceae
- Genus: Dorstenia
- Species: D. umbricola

Binomial name
- Dorstenia umbricola A.C.Sm.

Species of plant

Dorstenia umbricola is a plant species in the family Moraceae which is native to Peru and Ecuador.
