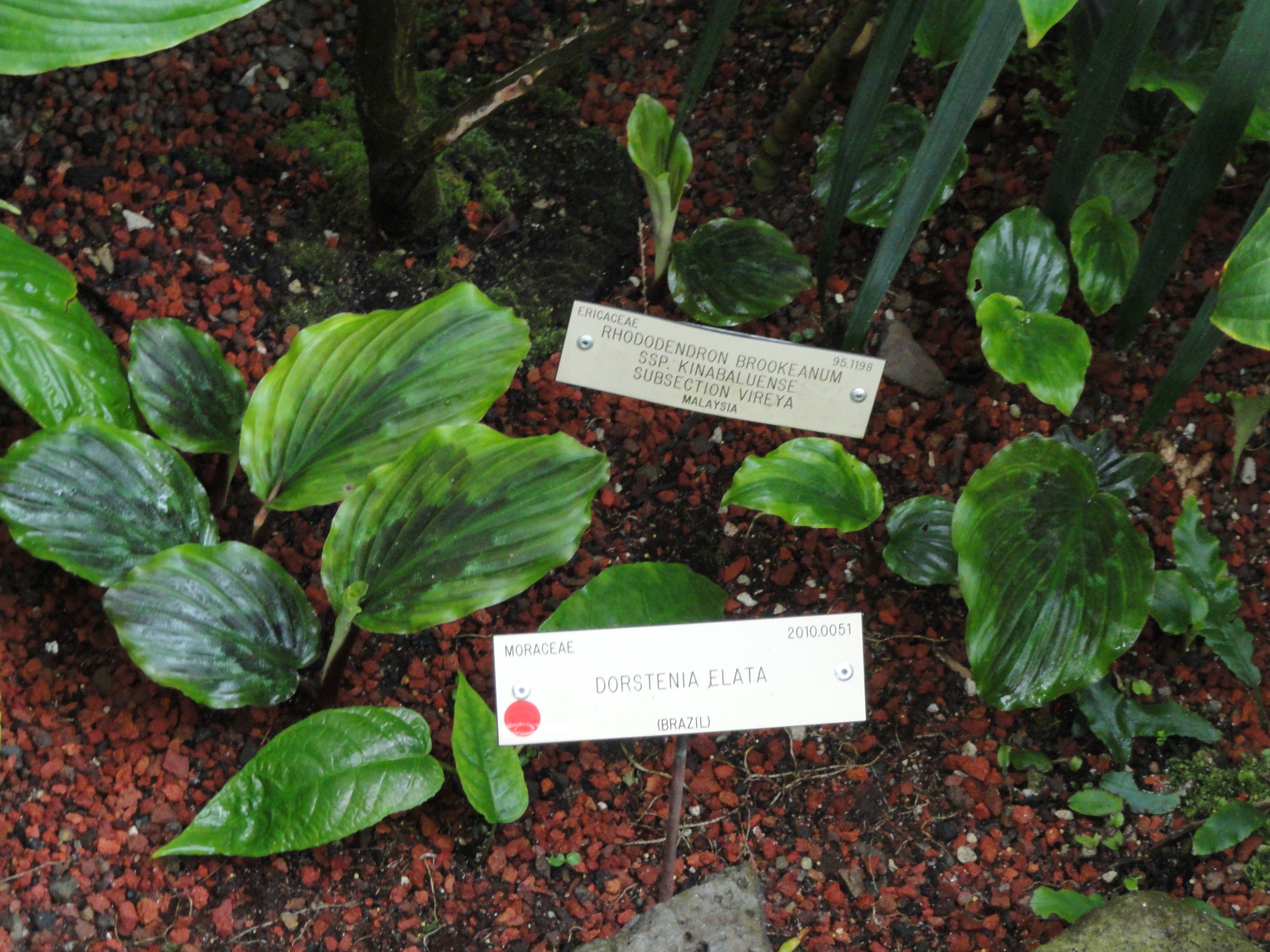

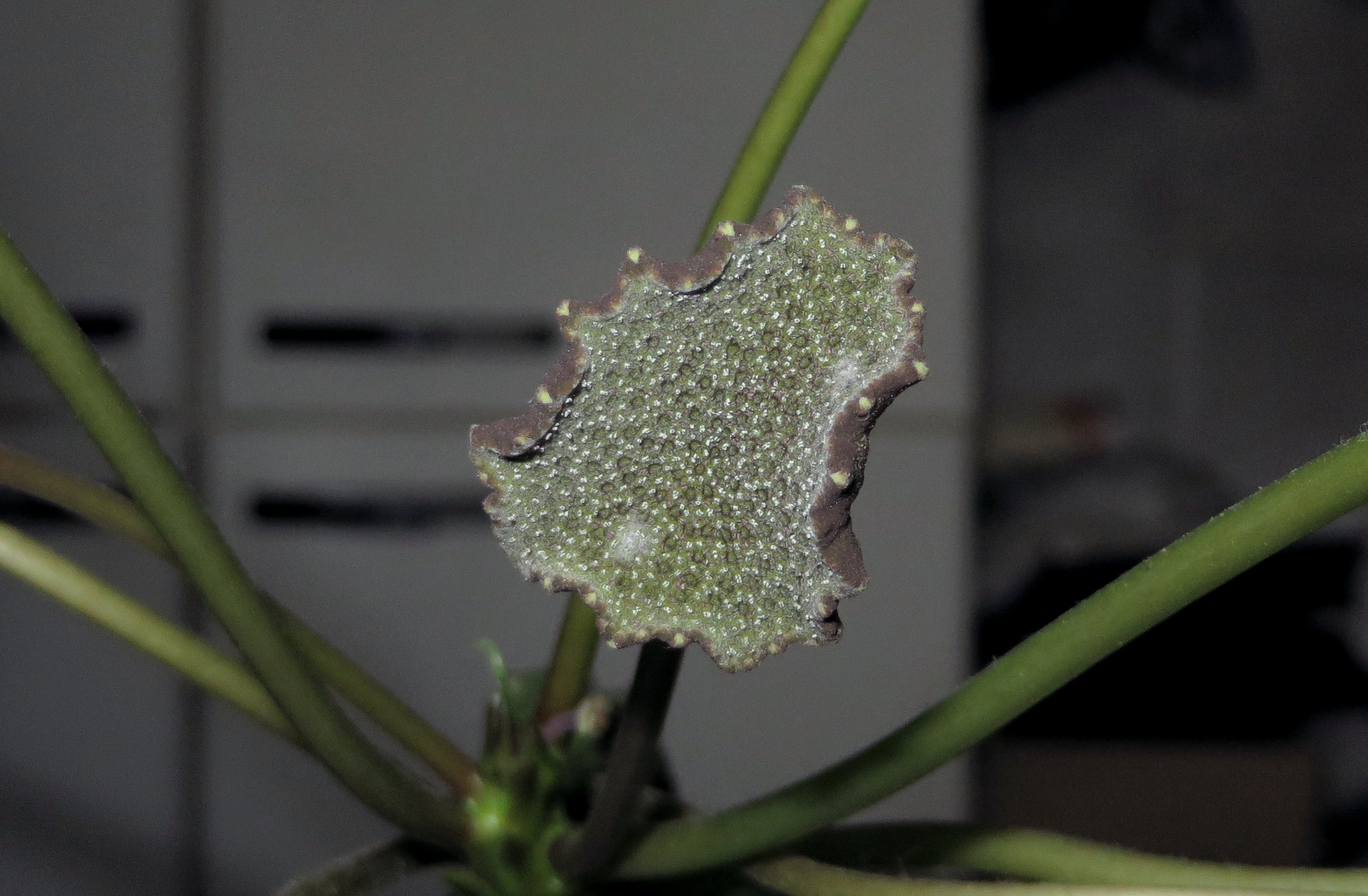
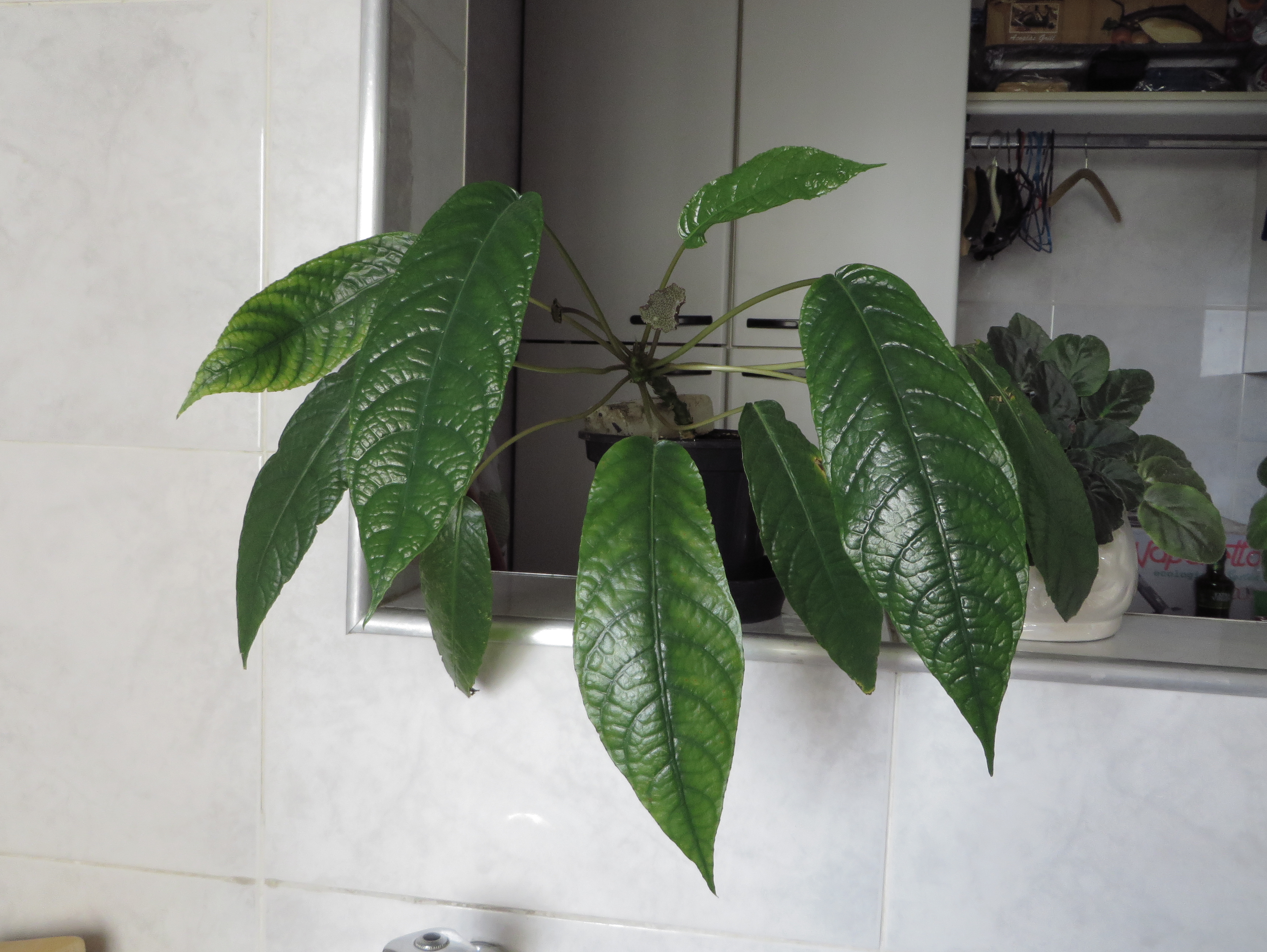
- University of California Botanical Garden Dorstenia elata, plant of the family Moraceae, Brazil Dorstenia elata, plant of the family Moraceae, Brazil

Scientific classification
- Kingdom: Plantae
- Clade: Tracheophytes
- Clade: Angiosperms
- Clade: Eudicots
- Clade: Rosids
- Order: Rosales
- Family: Moraceae
- Genus: Dorstenia
- Species: D. elata

Binomial name
- Dorstenia elata Hook.

Synonyms
- Dorstenia longifolia Moric. Dorstenia plumeriifolia Fisch. & C.A.Mey. Dorstenia sucrei Carauta

= Dorstenia elata =

Species of flowering plant

Dorstenia elata is a plant species in the family Moraceae.

== Description ==
The plant is native to the Atlantic Forest ecoregion of southeastern Brazil.

It is found in the states of Espírito Santo, Minas Gerais, and Rio de Janeiro.

Dorstenia elata is an endangered species.

Their flowers continuously bloom throughout the year.
