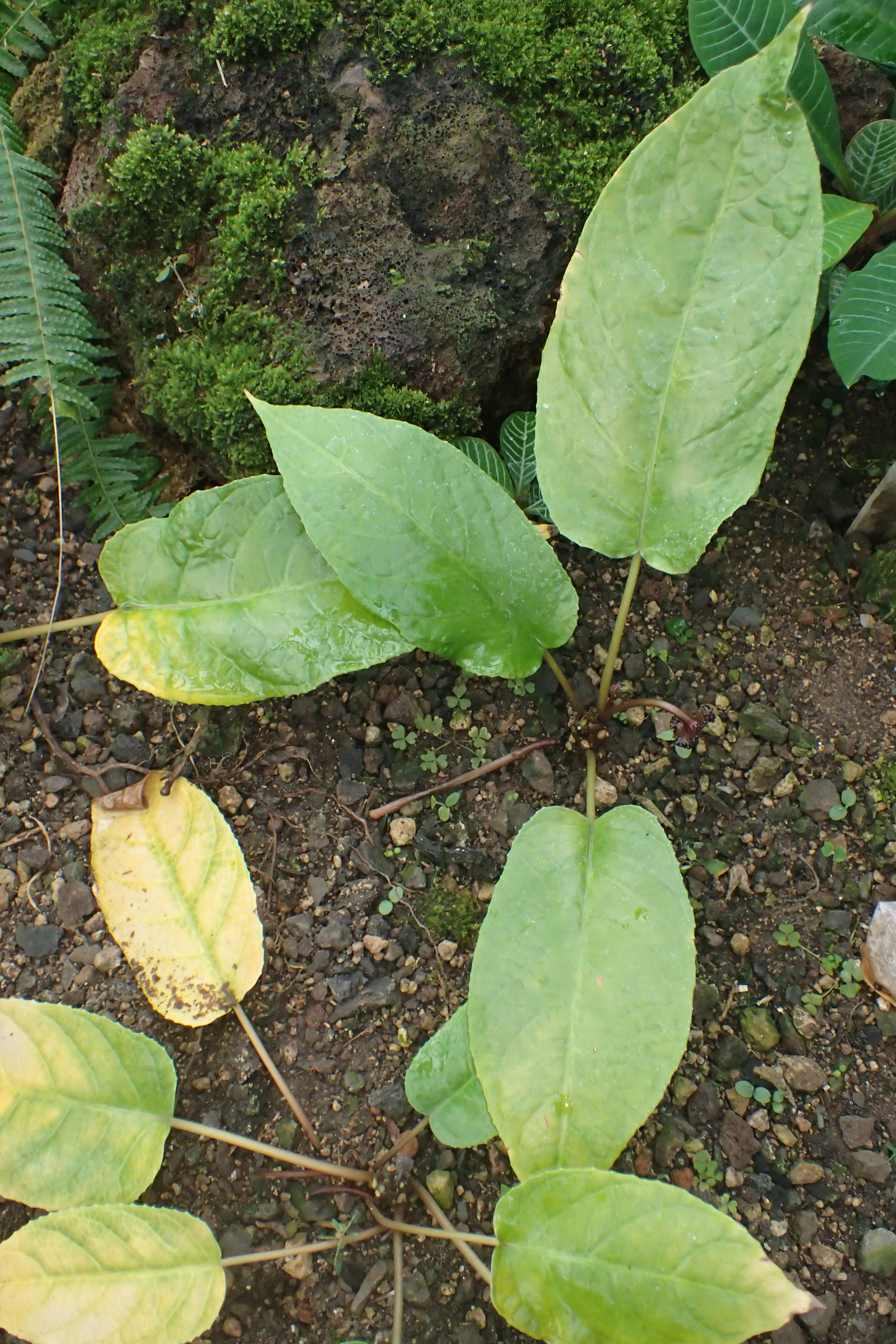

Scientific classification
- Kingdom: Plantae
- Clade: Tracheophytes
- Clade: Angiosperms
- Clade: Eudicots
- Clade: Rosids
- Order: Rosales
- Family: Moraceae
- Genus: Dorstenia
- Species: D. bahiensis

Binomial name
- Dorstenia bahiensis Klotzsch ex Fisch. & C.A.Mey.

Synonyms
- Dorstenia martiana Miq. Dorstenia anthuriifolia S.F.Blake

= Dorstenia bahiensis =

Species of flowering plant

Dorstenia bahiensis is a plant species in the family Moraceae which is native to eastern Brazil.
