= Dorstenia lindeniana =

Scientific classification
- Kingdom: Plantae
- Clade: Tracheophytes
- Clade: Angiosperms
- Clade: Eudicots
- Clade: Rosids
- Order: Rosales
- Family: Moraceae
- Genus: Dorstenia
- Species: D. lindeniana

Binomial name
- Dorstenia lindeniana Bureau

Species of flowering plant

Dorstenia lindeniana is a plant species in the family Moraceae which is native to Mexico, Guatemala and Belize.
