= Dorstenia hirta =

Scientific classification
- Kingdom: Plantae
- Clade: Tracheophytes
- Clade: Angiosperms
- Clade: Eudicots
- Clade: Rosids
- Order: Rosales
- Family: Moraceae
- Genus: Dorstenia
- Species: D. hirta

Binomial name
- Dorstenia hirta Desv.

Synonyms
- Dorstenia erecta Vell. Dorstenia hispida Hook. Dorstenia minor (Fisch. & C.A.Mey.) Bureau; Dorstenia erect Vell. var. minor (Fisch. & C.A.Mey.) Bureau

Species of flowering plant

Dorstenia hirta

Dorstenia hirta is an herbaceous plant species in the family Moraceae which is native to eastern Brazil.
