= Dorstenia conceptionis =

Scientific classification
- Kingdom: Plantae
- Clade: Tracheophytes
- Clade: Angiosperms
- Clade: Eudicots
- Clade: Rosids
- Order: Rosales
- Family: Moraceae
- Genus: Dorstenia
- Species: D. conceptionis

Binomial name
- Dorstenia conceptionis Carauta

Species of flowering plant

Dorstenia conceptionis is a plant species in the family Moraceae which is native to eastern Brazil.
