= Dorstenia aristeguietae =

Scientific classification
- Kingdom: Plantae
- Clade: Tracheophytes
- Clade: Angiosperms
- Clade: Eudicots
- Clade: Rosids
- Order: Rosales
- Family: Moraceae
- Genus: Dorstenia
- Species: D. aristeguietae

Binomial name
- Dorstenia aristeguietae Cuatrec.

Species of flowering plant

Dorstenia aristeguietae is a species of flowering plant in the family Moraceae. It is a perennial or subshrub native to northern Venezuela.
