= Dorstenia tuberosa =

Scientific classification
- Kingdom: Plantae
- Clade: Tracheophytes
- Clade: Angiosperms
- Clade: Eudicots
- Clade: Rosids
- Order: Rosales
- Family: Moraceae
- Genus: Dorstenia
- Species: D. tuberosa

Binomial name
- Dorstenia tuberosa Griseb.

Species of flowering plant

Dorstenia tuberosa is a plant species in the family Moraceae. It is native to Cuba.
