= Dorstenia appendiculata =

Scientific classification
- Kingdom: Plantae
- Clade: Tracheophytes
- Clade: Angiosperms
- Clade: Eudicots
- Clade: Rosids
- Order: Rosales
- Family: Moraceae
- Genus: Dorstenia
- Species: D. appendiculata

Binomial name
- Dorstenia appendiculata Miq.

Species of flowering plant

Dorstenia appendiculata is a species of subshrub or herb in the plant family Moraceae which is native to eastern Brazil.
