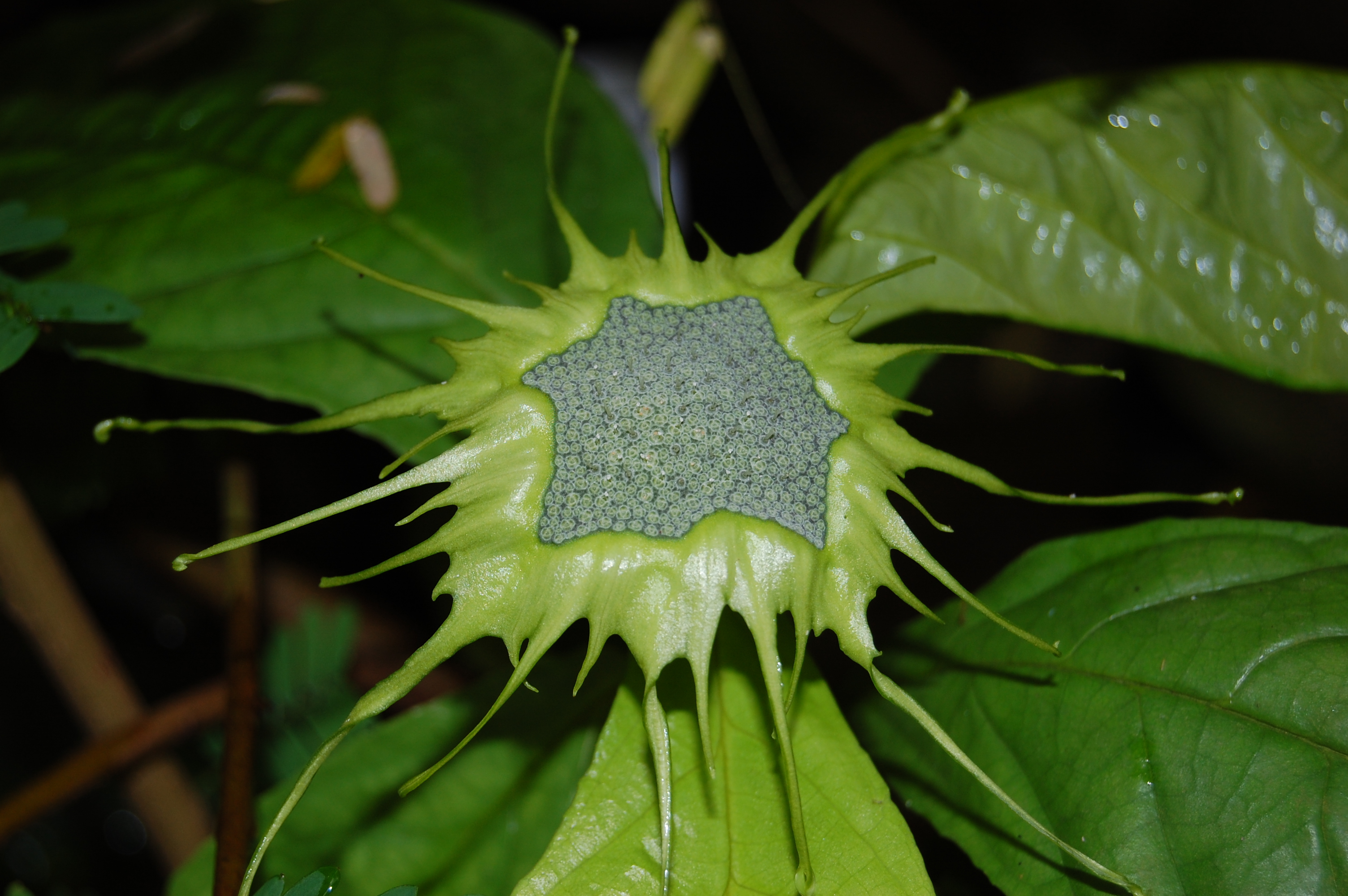

Scientific classification
- Kingdom: Plantae
- Clade: Tracheophytes
- Clade: Angiosperms
- Clade: Eudicots
- Clade: Rosids
- Order: Rosales
- Family: Moraceae
- Genus: Dorstenia
- Species: D. turnerifolia

Binomial name
- Dorstenia turnerifolia Fisch. & C.A.Mey.

Synonyms
- Dorstenia argentata Hook.f.

= Dorstenia turnerifolia =

Species of flowering plant

Dorstenia turnerifolia is a species of subshrub or herb in the family Moraceae which is native to eastern Brazil.
