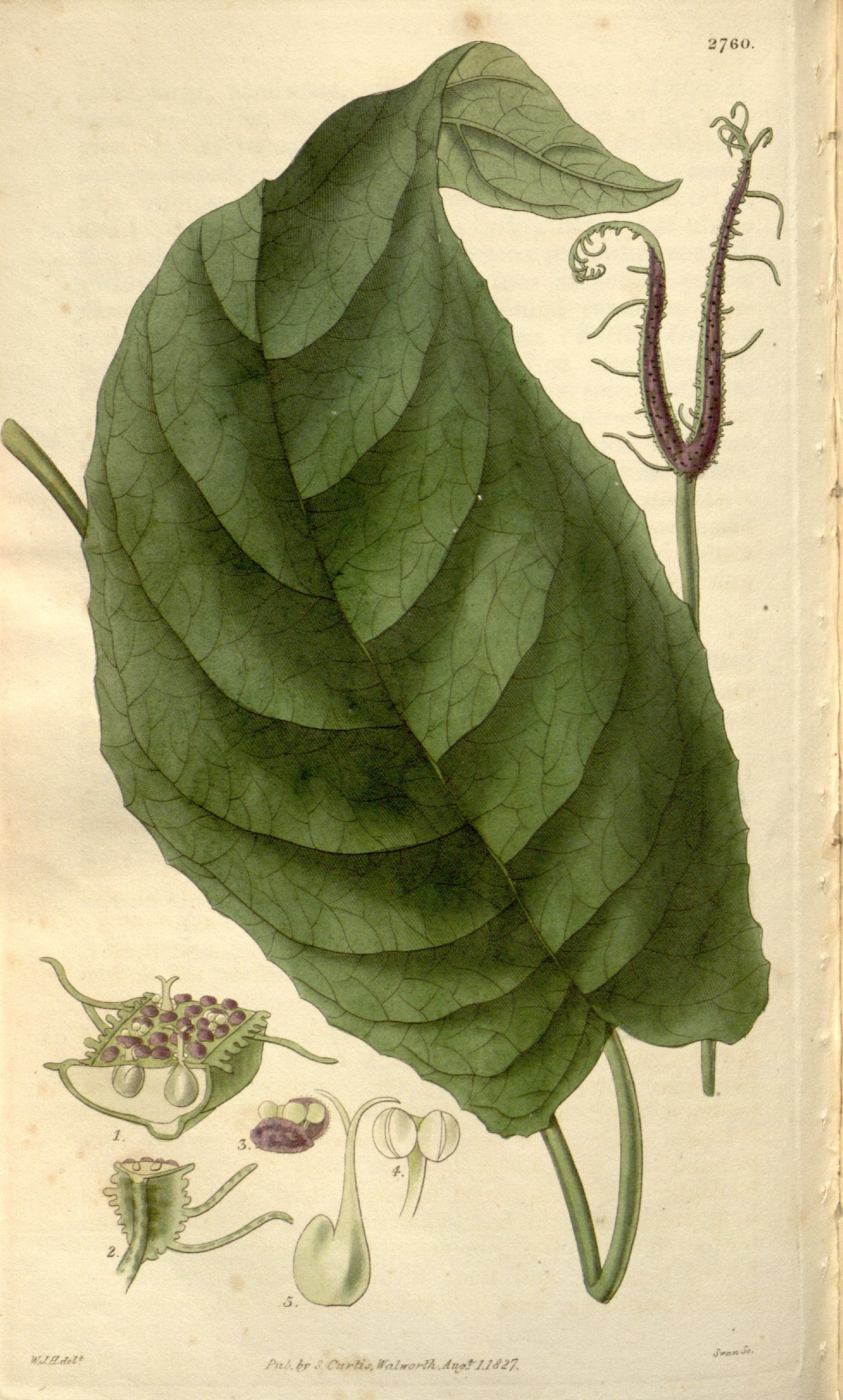

Scientific classification
- Kingdom: Plantae
- Clade: Tracheophytes
- Clade: Angiosperms
- Clade: Eudicots
- Clade: Rosids
- Order: Rosales
- Family: Moraceae
- Genus: Dorstenia
- Species: D. ramosa

Binomial name
- Dorstenia ramosa (Desv.) Carauta, C.Valente & Sucre

= Dorstenia ramosa =

Species of flowering plant

Dorstenia ramosa is a species of herb in the plant family Moraceae which is native to eastern Brazil.
