= Dorstenia mannii =

Scientific classification
- Kingdom: Plantae
- Clade: Tracheophytes
- Clade: Angiosperms
- Clade: Eudicots
- Clade: Rosids
- Order: Rosales
- Family: Moraceae
- Genus: Dorstenia
- Species: D. mannii

Binomial name
- Dorstenia mannii Hook.f., 1871

Species of flowering plant

Dorstenia mannii is a plant species in the genus Dorstenia.

6,8-Diprenyleriodictyol, dorsmanin C and dorsmanin F can be found in D. mannii.
