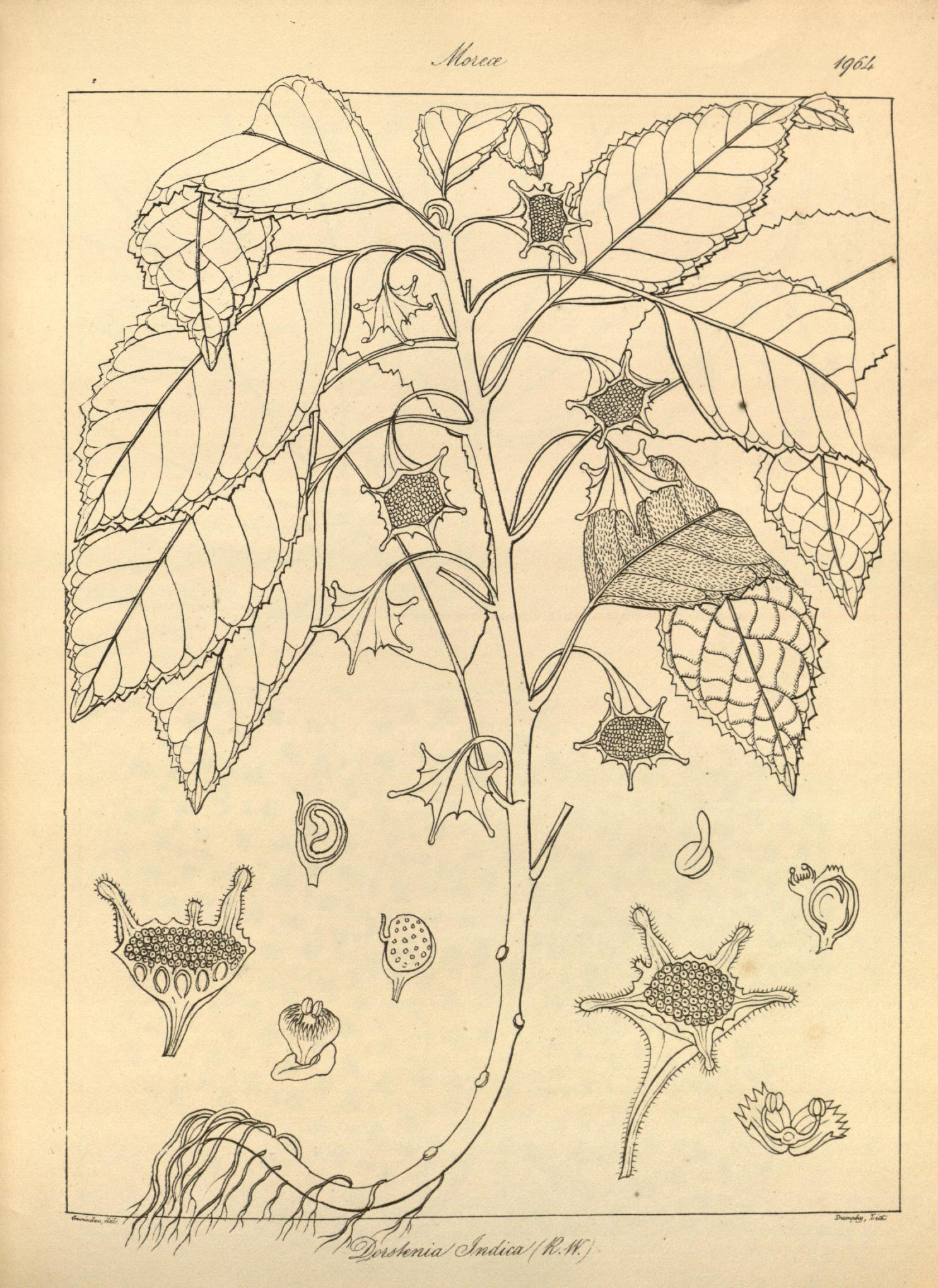

Scientific classification
- Kingdom: Plantae
- Clade: Tracheophytes
- Clade: Angiosperms
- Clade: Eudicots
- Clade: Rosids
- Order: Rosales
- Family: Moraceae
- Genus: Dorstenia
- Species: D. indica

Binomial name
- Dorstenia indica Wight

= Dorstenia indica =

Species of flowering plant

Dorstenia indica is a small plant species in the family Moraceae native to Southern India and Sri Lanka. It was first described by Robert Wight in 1853.

Dorstenia indica is the only representative of the genus Dorstenia that grows east of Arabia and in the tropical forests of Southern Asia. It belongs to the same complex as Dorstenia radiata from Arabia, Dorstenia gigas from Socotra, and West African species such as Dorstenia asteriscus.

== Description ==
Herb, tufted, 7.5 to 45 cm high. Stems fleshy, sparsely hairy, tapering, curved ascending, unbranched but proliferating from the base. Procumbent, ascending after rooting. Latex white. Leaves alternate, to 9 x 2.5 cm, obovate or oblanceolate, acute, base attenuate or cuneate, membranous, distantly toothed, sparsely hirsute along the nerves beneath, nerves 8-13 pairs; petiole 1 cm long. Inflorescence axillary, solitary. Flowers numerous, arranged on a simple or lobed androgynous receptacle. Receptacle axillary, solitary, discoid, 5-angled, to 1.5 cm across, marginal lobes to 0.5 cm long; peduncles to 2 cm long. Male flowers, numerous, towards the periphery of the receptacle. Very small, 0.5 mm high. Perianth with two slight lobes, connate and adnate with receptacle; stamens 1-2 (-3). Female flowers are grouped at the centre and open before male flowers. Ovary sunken in the tissue of the receptacle; style lateral. Perianth vaguely 2 lobed; mouth almost closed. Ovule pendulous, style lateral. The fruit is a crustaceous achene, sunken, 2 mm.

As with other Dorstenia species, the seeds are probably dispersed by exploding fruits.

== Habitat ==
Grows on rocks and tree trunks in moist and shady habitats in deciduous and evergreen forests.

== Distribution ==
The distribution of Dorstenia indica is confined to the hills and mountains of Southern India and Sri Lanka. In India it grows in the Western Ghats, with Nashik in Maharashtra as northernmost limit. In Sri Lanka it has been recorded from the hill and mountain region in the center of the country, from 200 to 2000 meters altitude.

== Pictures ==
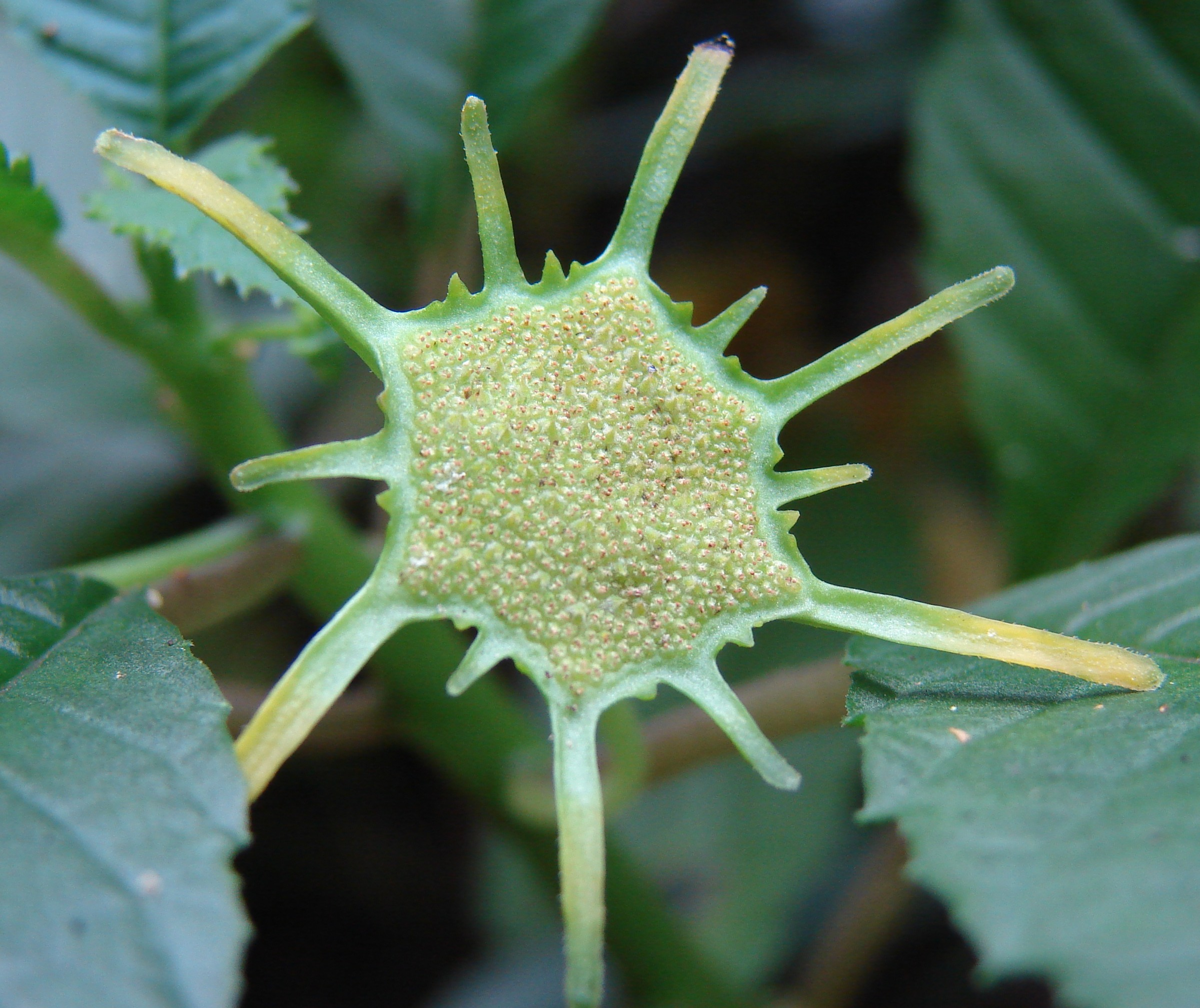
Flower structure.

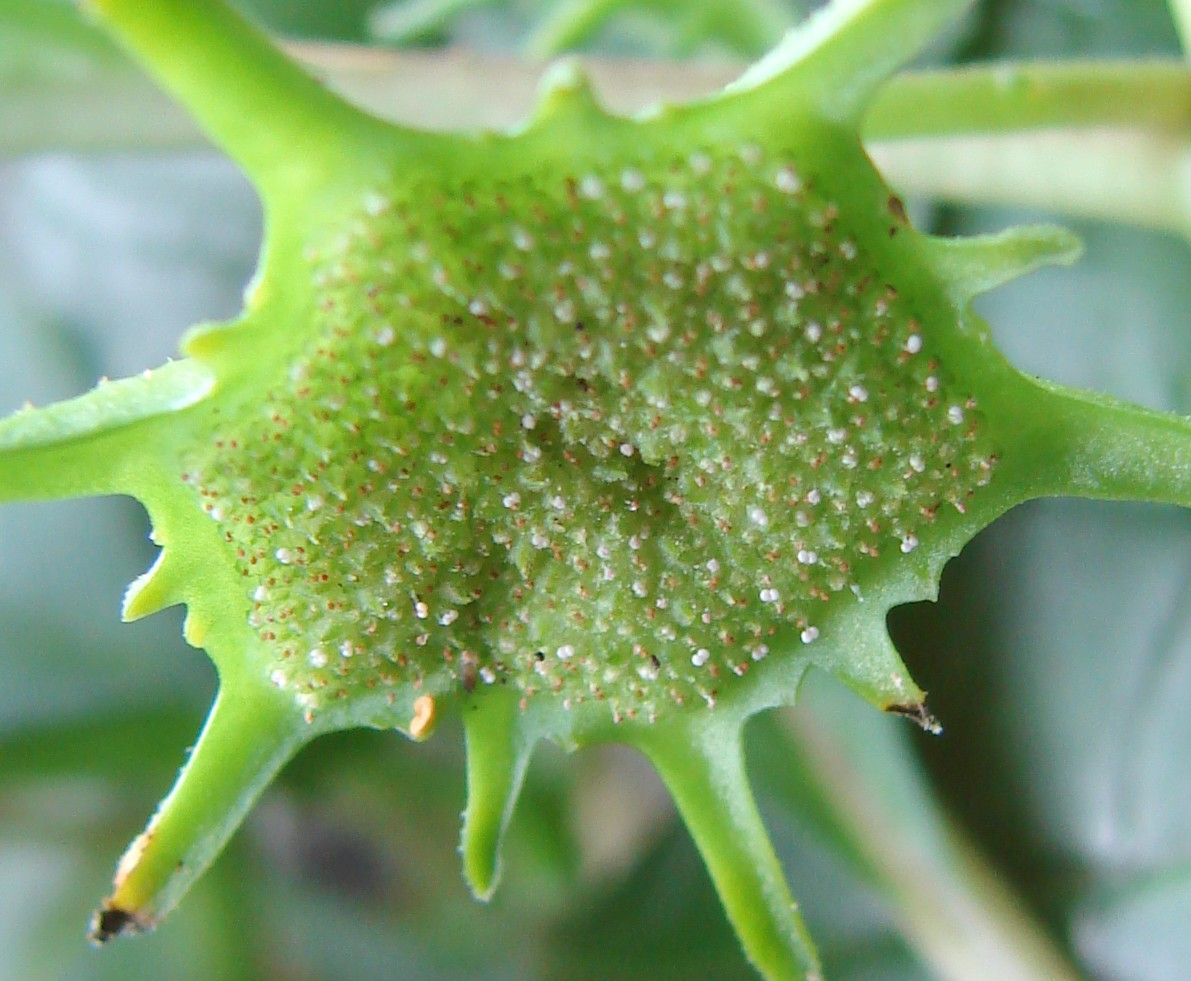
Close up of flower structure with flowers (male flowers are white, female green).

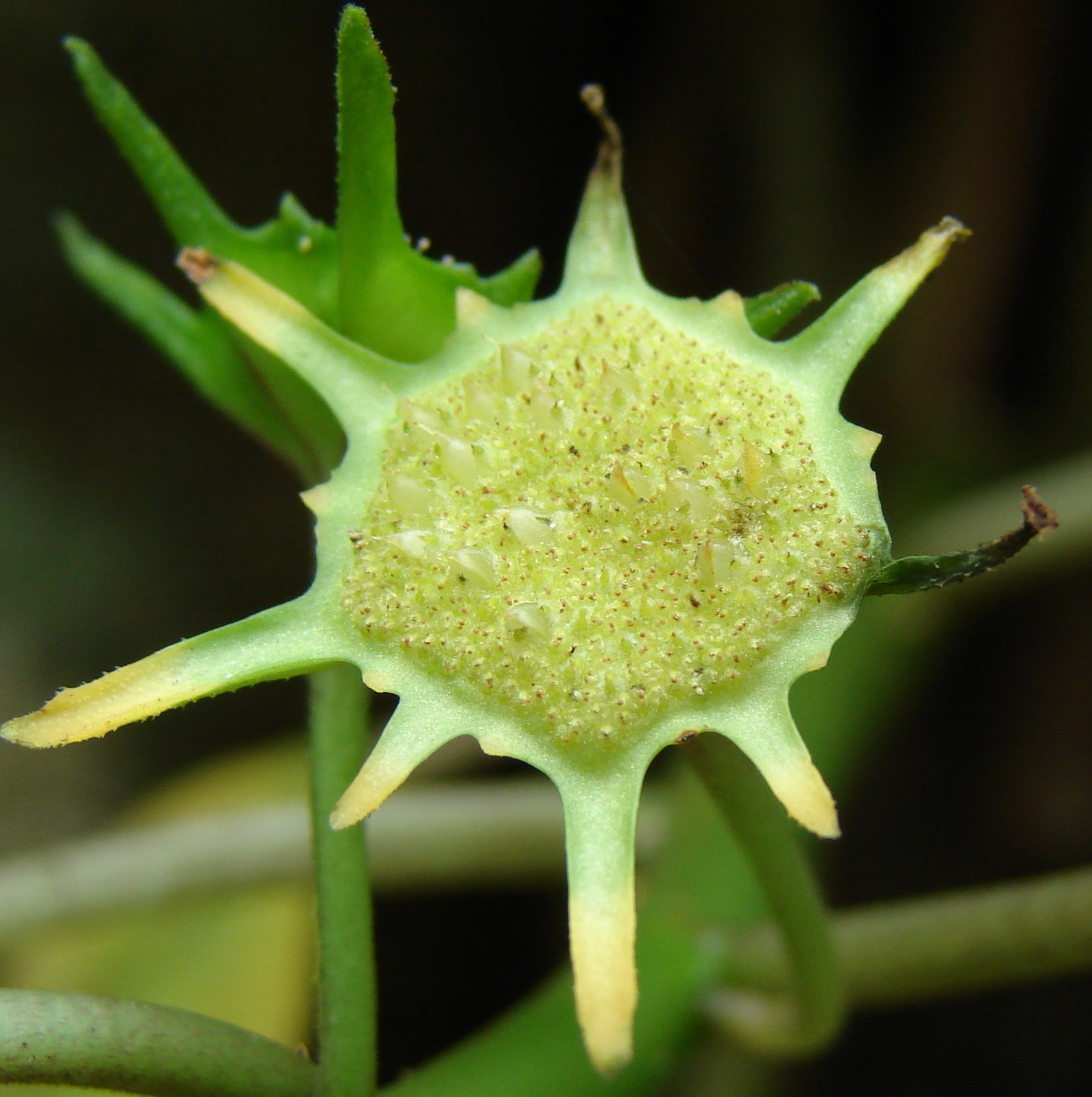
Mature flower structure with fruits.

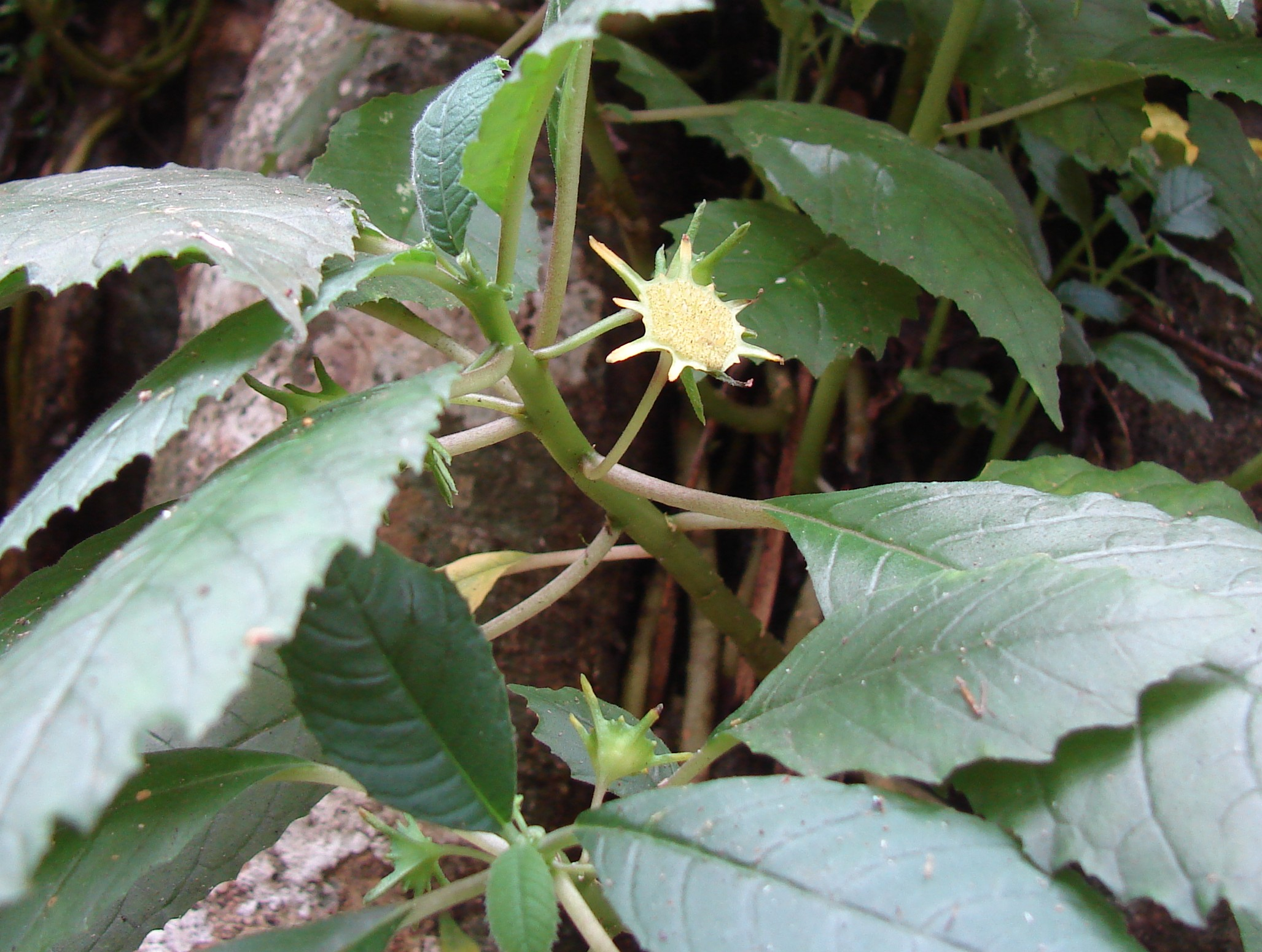
Flower structure and leaves.

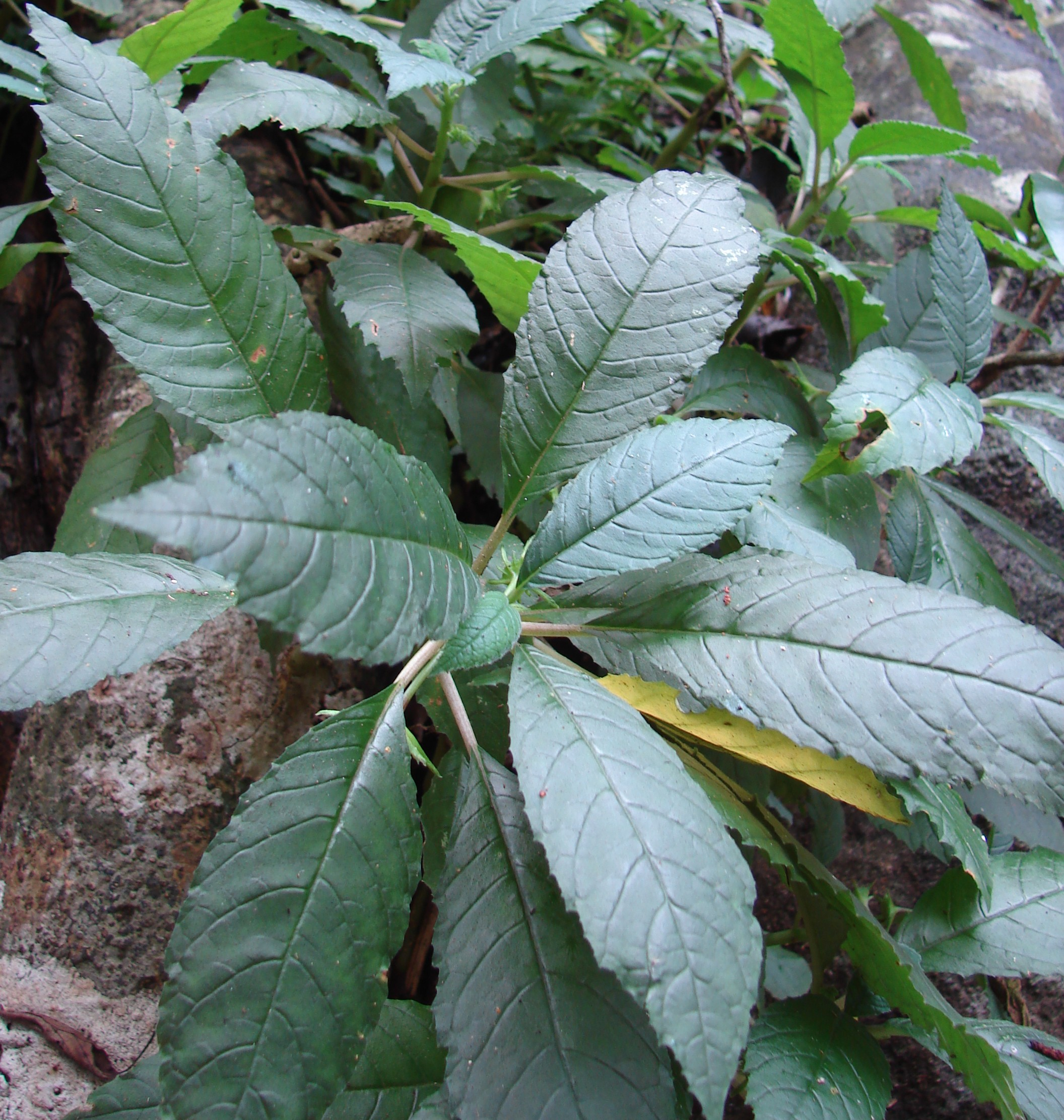
Leaves.

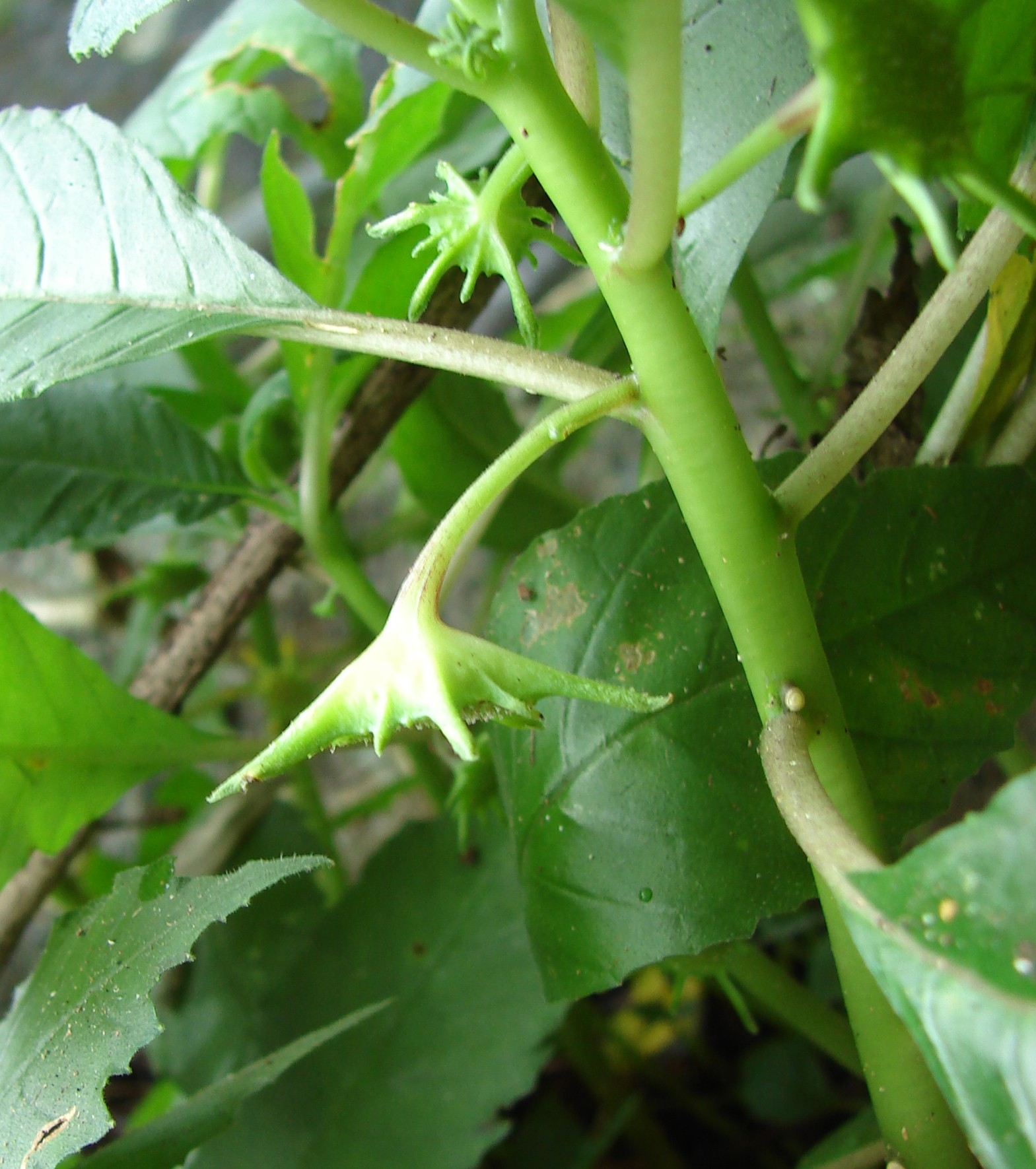
Stem and flower structure .

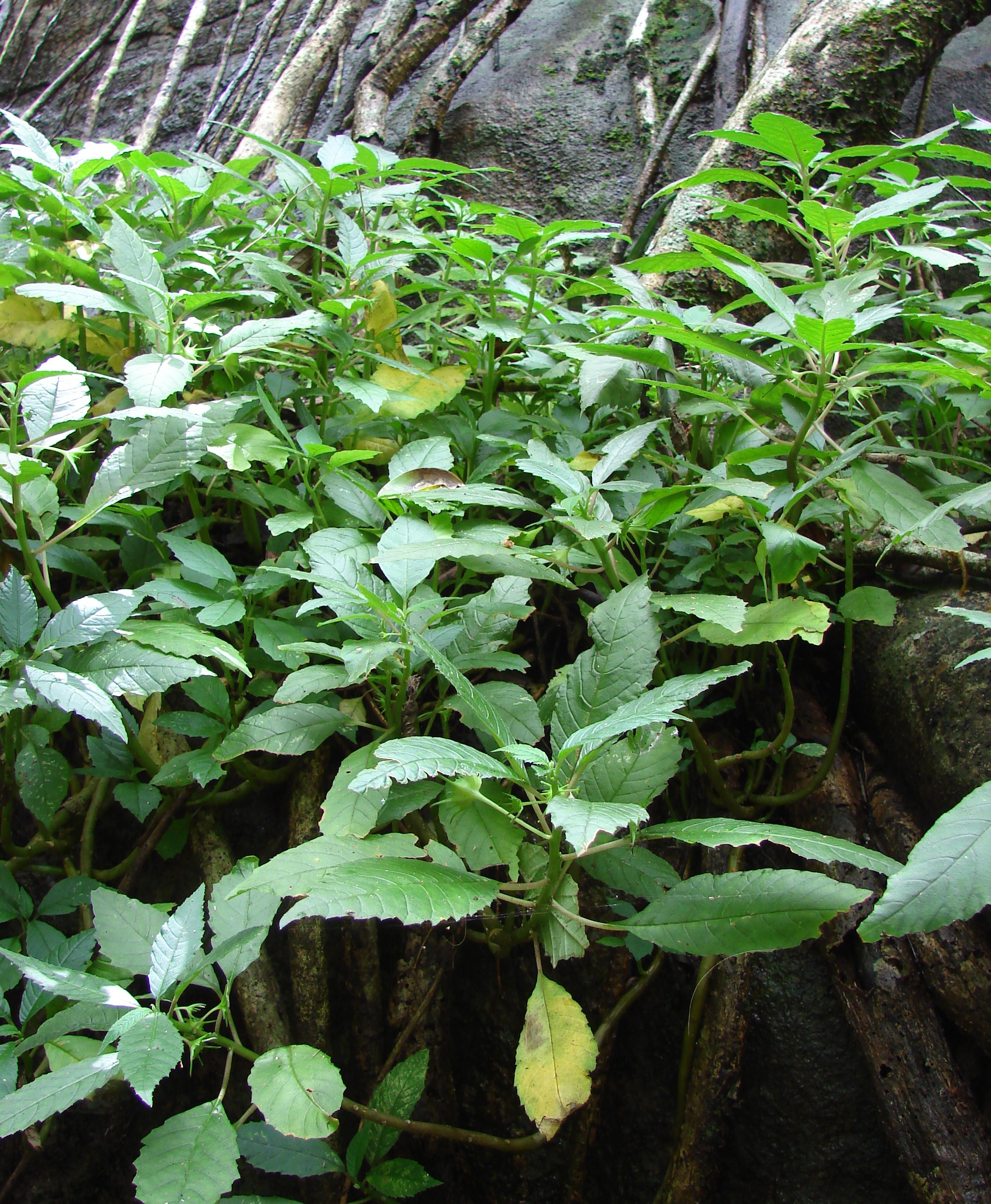
Clump growing between the roots of a Ficus on a granite cliff in a hill forest in central Sri Lanka.

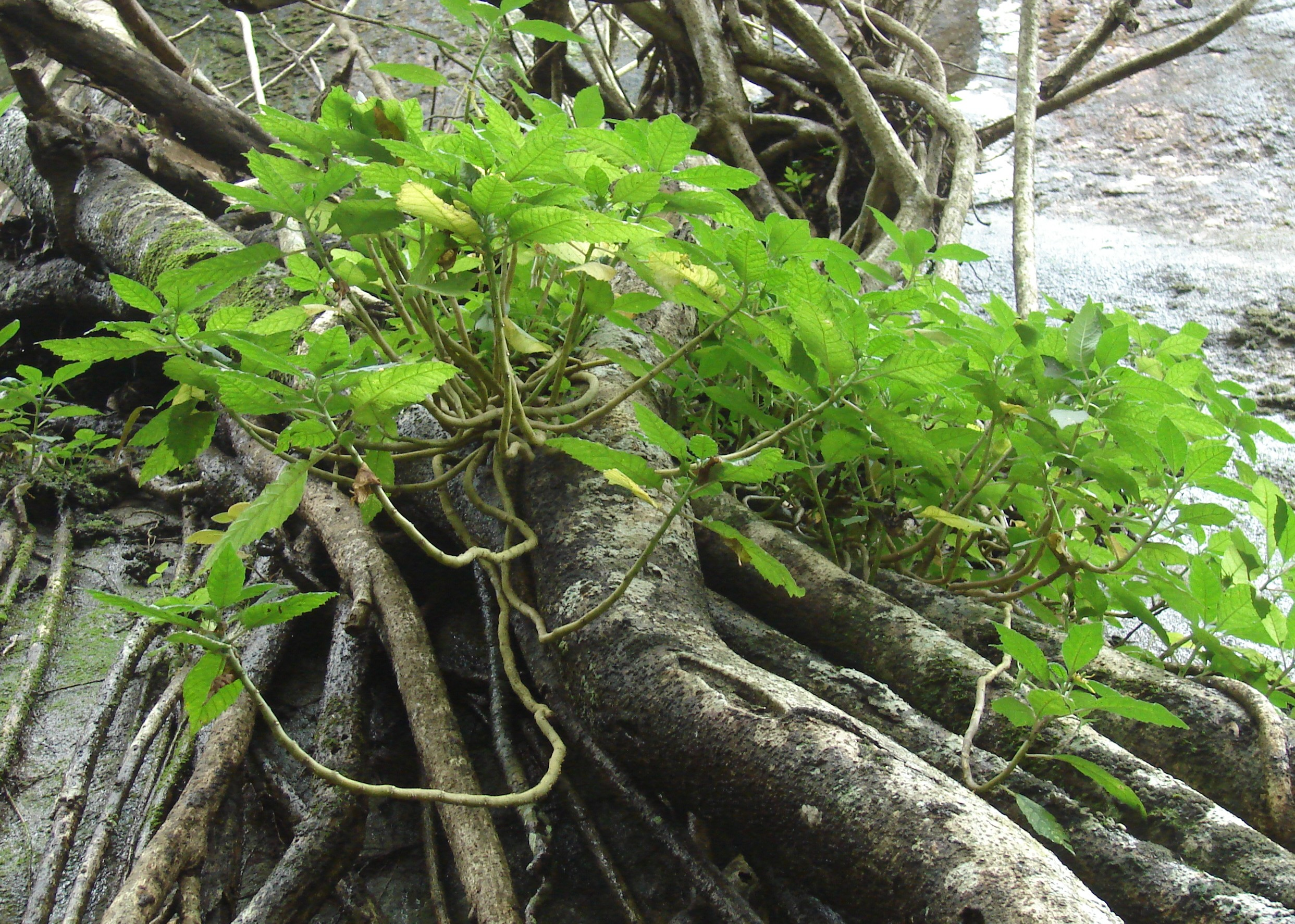
Clump growing between roots of a Ficus on a cliff.
