= Dorstenia grazielae =

Scientific classification
- Kingdom: Plantae
- Clade: Tracheophytes
- Clade: Angiosperms
- Clade: Eudicots
- Clade: Rosids
- Order: Rosales
- Family: Moraceae
- Genus: Dorstenia
- Species: D. grazielae

Binomial name
- Dorstenia grazielae Carauta, C.Valente & Sucre

Species of flowering plant

Dorstenia grazielae is a plant species in the family Moraceae, which is native to eastern Brazil.

This plant was named in honour of Graziela Barroso, a Brazilian botanist.
