= Cornelis Christiaan Berg =

Dutch botanist

- Born: 7 February 1934; Bandung, Indonesia
- Died: 31 August 2012 (aged 78); Rotterdam
- Education: University of Utrecht
- Scientific career
- Fields: Botany
- Workplaces: University of Utrecht; University of Bergen; University of Leiden; Bergen Museum; Norwegian Arboretum
- Doctoral students: Johannes Cornelis Anceaux

Cornelis Christiaan (Cees) Berg (1934–2012) was a Dutch botanist known for his work on the plant family Moraceae.

== Early life and education ==
Berg was born on 7 February 1934 in Bandung, Indonesia, then part of the Dutch East Indies, and later moved to Sumatra, near Medan. During World War II, his father was conscripted, and died during the Japanese conquest. Berg was interned with his mother and brothers, and moved to a men's camp at the age of 10. Berg, his mother and siblings, all survived their internment, but his mother died of starvation shortly after. After the war, the orphaned siblings were raised with foster families in the Netherlands.

He got his education in the Netherlands, where he went to the school of horticulture at Breda.

== Career ==
From 1959 to 1966 he worked at some colleges and from 1960 to 1986 held several positions at the University of Utrecht. Later on he graduated from that university in 1962 and 1964 respectively with a Ph.D. in 1973. A year before he published his first work, a thesis called Studies in Moraceae which was printed in Flora Neotropica. On 11 November 1985 he became a director of the Norwegian Arboretum and the same day became professor of botany at the University of Bergen. On 31 July 2005 he left it and on 1 September 2005 he became professor emeritus at Bergen Museum. From 18 December 2001 he also worked at the University of Leiden, where he stayed till his death in 2012. During his life he published 151 papers on Moraceae plant species.

== Honours ==
Dorstenia bergiana, a plant in the Moraceae, and Platyscapa bergi, a fig wasp, are named in honour of Berg.
