= Charles Phillips =

Chuck or Charles Phillips or Philips may refer to:

- Charles Phillips (archaeologist) (1901–1985), British archaeologist
- Charles Philips (artist), (c. 1703–1747), English painter
- Charles Phillips (businessman) (born 1959), American businessman, CEO of Infor
- Charles Phillips (bishop) (died 1906), Nigerian clergyman and bishop of Ondo
- Charles Phillips (figure skater) (born 1938), American figure skater
- Charles Phillips (barrister) (1787?–1859), Irish barrister and writer
- Charles Phillips (Wisconsin politician, born 1824) (1824–1879), American politician in Wisconsin
- Charles D. F. Phillips (1830–1904), British medical doctor
- Charles Franklin Phillips (1910–1998), American economist
- Charles James Phillips (1863–1940), Anglo-American philatelist
- Charles Henry Phillips (1822–1888), English pharmacist known for his invention Phillips Milk of Magnesia
- Charles H. Phillips (1859–1938), American lawyer and politician in Wisconsin
- Charles L. Phillips (1856–1937), United States Army officer
- Charles McGowan Phillips (1870–1955), Singaporean educator and writer
- C. E. S. Phillips (Charles Edmund Stanley Phillips, 1871–1945), British radiologist and artist
- Chuck Philips (1952–2024), American journalist
- Chuck Phillips (runner) (born c. 1928), American steeplechase runner, 1952 NCAA runner-up for the UCLA Bruins track and field team

== See also ==
- Charlie Phillips (disambiguation)
