= David Prain =

Scottish botanist (1857–1944)

Sir David Prain CMG CIE FRS FRSE
- Born: 11 July 1857; Fettercairn, Scotland
- Died: 16 March 1944 (aged 86); Whyteleafe, England
- Education: Aberdeen Grammar School
- Alma mater: University of Edinburgh
- Scientific career
- Fields: Botany

Sir David Prain CMG CIE FRS FRSE (11 July 1857 – 16 March 1944) was a Scottish botanist who worked in India at the Calcutta Botanical Garden and went on to become Director of the Royal Botanic Gardens, Kew.

== Life ==
Born to David Prain, a saddler, and his wife Mary Thomson, in Fettercairn, Scotland, in 1857, Prain attended the Fettercairn Parish School and then Aberdeen Grammar School. He then studied medicine at the University of Aberdeen, where he gained his M.A. in 1878. After teaching for two years at Ramsgate College, he returned to Aberdeen and thence to the University of Edinburgh, earning an MB ChM in 1883 with highest honours. He was demonstrator of anatomy at the College of Surgeons of Edinburgh in 1882 and 1883, and at the University of Aberdeen in 1883 and 1884.

In 1884 Prain was recommended to Sir George King (1840–1909), home on leave from his position as director of the Royal Botanic Garden at Calcutta and looking for a medical student with botanical interests to enter the Indian Medical Service. Prain duly went to India as a physician / botanist in the service, and in 1887 was appointed curator of the Calcutta herbarium.

In 1888 he was elected a Fellow of the Royal Society of Edinburgh. His proposers were Sir Andrew Douglas Maclagan, Argyll Robertson, Alexander Crum Brown, and Sir William Turner.

In 1898 he was promoted to Director of the Royal Botanic Garden, Calcutta as well as the Botanical Survey of India, and superintendent of Cinchona Cultivation in Bengal, remaining there until 1905. From 1898 to 1905 he also served as Professor of Botany at the Medical College of Calcutta. In 1905 he became Director of the Royal Botanic Gardens, Kew, a post he held until 1922 when he was succeeded by Sir Arthur William Hill. He was appointed a Commander of the Order of the Indian Empire (CIE) in the 1906 Birthday Honours by King Edward VII. In 1912 he was knighted by King George V.

Perhaps Prain's most difficult time as Director of the Kew gardens was in the years 1904–1908 when he was one of the lead players in an industrial dispute which pitted him against his garden staff and the Kew Garden trade union. Surprisingly his chief adversary was his sub-foreman, William Purdom, representing a band of young gardener trainees. The dispute arose because a cohort of these trainees were not fully informed that their positions were only temporary. In addition to that the gardens industrial conditions were onerous, with a salary for someone such as Purdom well below the usual rates. William Purdom was ferocious as the union representative, bringing the newspapers of the time, the Kew Guild and leading politicians into the fray. Strikes and go-slows became a heated occurrence with Prain perhaps unfortunately blamed for an error made by his predecessor. Prain, who came from a humble background himself, was aware that his workers' grievances were well justified and went out of his way to find alternative positions in private employ for all those affected. Purdom appears to have continued the fight on principle and on a personal basis for another year until Prain finally made it a case that his combative gardener Purdom had to go, or he himself would. The establishment had no option but to back the Kew Director. The bizarre and unexpected twist however came in the final days just before Christmas 1908. Despite being a bane to the Kew Director, the latter clearly recognized the talents of William Purdom and recommended his employee as a plant collector for a joint venture by Harry Veitch and the Arnold Arboretum of Harvard University to the northern provinces of China in 1909. No sooner had Purdom's dismissal been finalized, than that same establishment arranged for the British administration, including the Legation in Beijing, to give him all assistance. David Prain was evidently a very fair and honourable man.

He served as President of the Linnean Society 1916 to 1919.

Prain died at Whyteleafe in Surrey on 16 March 1944.

== Publications ==
- Flora of the Sundribuns (1903)
- Bengal Plants (1903) republished 1963
- Diseases of Cultivated Trees and Plants (1914)
- Science Discipline (1930)

== Honours and awards ==
In May 1905, Prain was elected a Fellow of the Royal Society. In 1907 he was awarded an honorary doctorate of philosophy at the Linnaeus' tercentenary in Uppsala, Sweden, and became a member of the Royal Swedish Academy of Sciences in 1912. He was also knighted in 1912. He was elected an International Member of both the American Philosophical Society in 1917 and the United States National Academy of Sciences in 1920. He served as president of the Linnean Society from 1916 to 1919, president of the Association of Applied Biologists from 1920 to 1921 and president of the Quekett Microscopical Club from 1924 to 1926. He was awarded the Veitch Memorial Medal of the Royal Horticultural Society in 1925 and the Linnean Medal in 1935.

In 1888 George King and Joseph Dalton Hooker published Prainea King ex Hook.f. a flowering plant in the Moraceae family and named in David Prain's honour. Later in 2019 Hiroyoshi Ohashi and Kazuaki Ohashi published Daprainia H.Ohashi & K.Ohashi (in the Fabaceae family).

== Private life ==
In 1887 Prain married Margaret Caird Thomson, daughter of Reverend William Thomson of Belhevie, south of Aberdeen. They had one son, Theodore Prain (1888–1914), who was killed in the first weeks of the First World War whilst serving as a lieutenant in the Leicestershire Regiment.
