= Charles McGowan Phillips =

Singaporean educator (1870–1955)

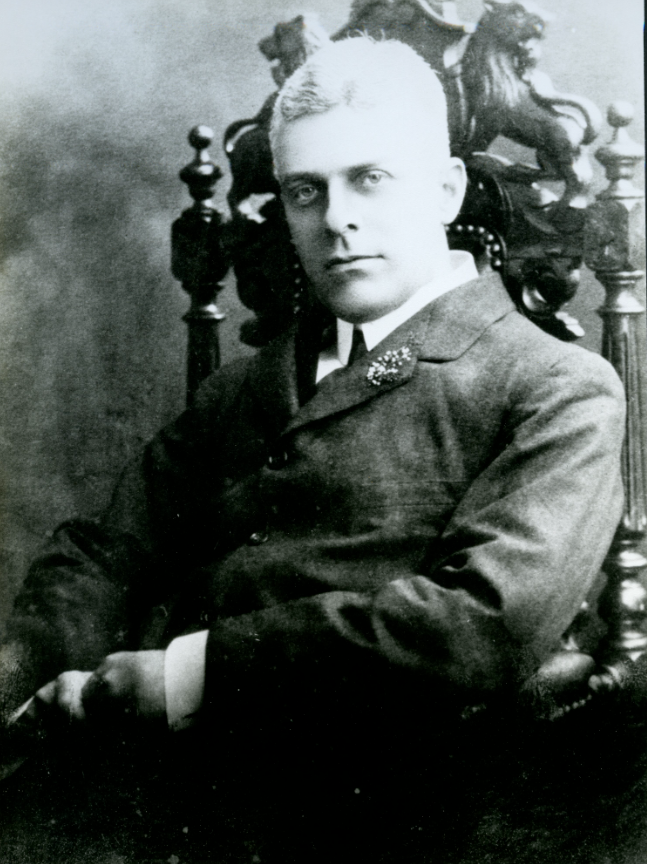
Phillips as principal of Raffles Institution.

Charles McGowan Phillips (April 1870 – 1 August 1955) was a Singaporean educator and writer who served as the headmaster of Raffles Institution (RI). After receiving his tertiary education in England, Phillips returned to Singapore to serve as the assistant master at RI. He was appointed to act as the school's principal in 1901, and continued in this capacity before officially assuming the post in 1907. He continued as principal for nearly one-and-a-half decades before retiring in 1921.

== Early life and education ==
Phillips was born in Singapore in April 1870. The son of preacher Charles Phillips, the founder of the Middle Road Church, he grew up with two siblings. He was studying at Raffles Institution (RI) by 1886. In July 1889, he and H. A. Scott were awarded the Government Higher Scholarships, renamed the Queen's Scholarship shortly after. He then left for England, studying at the Saffron Walden Grammar School for a year before enrolling at the Jesus College, Cambridge, from which he graduated in 1893 with a Bachelor of Arts and Doctor of Laws (honours) degree.

== Career ==
On his graduation from Jesus College, Phillips returned to Singapore, and in October 1894 he became the assistant master to Principal Richmond William Hullett at RI. The latter went on leave to Europe in March 1901, with Phillips being appointed to act as Principal in his place, continuing in this capacity when Hullett was eventually appointed the Inspector of Schools instead. In May, Phillips founded the school's cadet corps, comprising both students and alumni of the school. He was then described in The Straits Budget as "energetic". In teaching, Phillips frequently incorporated issues of The Singapore Free Press into his lessons to "[explain] to his students the current affairs of the day." As the acting headmaster, he authored A Text-book of the Malay Peninsula. Published by Kelly & Walsh with the approval of the Education Department, the book was intended for the students of English schools across British Malaya. The Straits Times felt that the book would likely prove a "popular and useful addition to the scholar's outfit" and noted that it was a "decided departure from the old-fashioned style of school book." He acted as the Director of Public Instruction in 1906.

In December 1906, it was announced that Phillips would officially be assuming the post of Principal at RI on 1 January, succeeding Hullett who had by then left Singapore. He became the first former student of the school to serve as its principal. Also in January, the second edition of his textbook, titled The Malay Peninsula, Historical and Geographical, was published by Kelly & Walsh. The Singapore Free Press found it "valuable", as well as "excellently and clearly printed." The book was translated into Malay by fellow writer and educator Abdul Majid bin Zainuddin of the Malay College Kuala Kangsar. Published by the Methodist Publishing House in Singapore in April 1912, the text mistakenly credited Phillips as "C. L. Phillips". He represented Singapore at a conference of Malayan headmasters, held in Kuala Lumpur in January 1913. In December 1918, he was appointed by the Governor of the Straits Settlements, Sir Arthur Young, to a committee which was to organise the centenary celebrations in Singapore. He organised the index and proofread Sir Song Ong Siang's contribution to the centenary, One Hundred Years' History of the Chinese in Singapore, which would only be completed and published in 1923, several years after the celebrations.

His tenure as Principal coincided with the outbreak of World War I in 1914 and its conclusion in 1918. As a result, he oversaw "rapid changes" in the school's staff and the school "inevitably" lost all of its European staff during the war. In February 1921, Phillips announced that he would be retiring to England on pension. The Malaya Tribune then noted that the school had "developed enormously" under his tenure, and that: "Only those who have any knowledge of local educational work can realise what the loss of Mr. Phillips will mean to Raffles." The school held a farewell on 14 April, shortly before his departure from the colony. The Morning Tribune later recalled that Phillips was, alongside Sir Song and Lim Boon Keng, among the Queen's Scholars who returned to the region and "played a leading part in public affairs here." According to historian and future RI principal Eugene Wijeysingha, it was "claimed that Phillips did not work with the sincerity equal to that of Hullett", who was revered in the role. Peter Horton argues that Phillips "continued what Hullett had begun" with regards to promoting athleticism at the school, connecting this with Phillip's time at Cambridge coinciding with the "high point of 'Hearties' fame and the outstanding moment of athletic glory".

== Personal life and death ==
In the years following his return to Singapore from Cambridge, Phillips joined and played for the Singapore Cricket Club and the Raffles Cricket Club. He was active with the Singapore Swimming Club, and performed with the Singapore Philharmonic Society as a harmonium player. A Freemason, Phillips was appointed the honorary secretary of the local Masonic Club in September 1904. On 31 August 1910, Phillips married Dorothy Marguerite Emson at the St. Mary's Littlehampton church in the town of Littlehampton in West Sussex, England. The couple had three children

Phillips was also a volunteer with the Singapore Volunteer Corps (SVC) and a member of the Singapore Rifle Association. By October 1900, he held the record for the highest score attained at the rifle ranges at Tanglin and Balestier. He represented Singapore at interport shooting matches. On 11 or 12 August 1902, a tiger which had been performing on reclaimed land off Beach Road "broke from captivity", after which it eventually made its way to the billiard room of the Raffles Hotel, coming to rest underneath the room's floor. The hotel's management then requested early in the morning on 13 August that Phillips "deal with the situation." He eventually shot and killed the tiger with his Lee–Enfield rifle. In July 1906, he was promoted to the rank of Captain within the SVC, being in charge of the Cadet Company. He was a member of the contingent sent to represent Singapore at the 1910 Bisley shooting competition, where he won the top prize.

On his retirement, he and his family moved to England, initially settling on Portland Road in Hove, East Sussex. Even after removing to England, he maintained a "lively interest in Singapore affairs" into the 1930s. He continued to hold this interest until his death. In 1939, he and his family were living in the county of Devon. Phillips died in Newton Abbot on 1 August 1955.
