= Artocarpus montanus =

Conservation status
- Endangered (IUCN 3.1)

Scientific classification
- Kingdom: Plantae
- Clade: Embryophytes
- Clade: Tracheophytes
- Clade: Angiosperms
- Clade: Eudicots
- Clade: Rosids
- Order: Rosales
- Family: Moraceae
- Tribe: Artocarpeae
- Genus: Artocarpus
- Species: A. montanus

Binomial name
- Artocarpus montanus E.M.Gardner & Zerega

Species of plant

Artocarpus montanus is a species of flowering tree in the mulberry and jackfruit family (Moraceae) distributed and endemic in southern and central Vietnam. It was first discovered in 70-year-old specimens at the Missouri Botanical Gardens, and confirmed as a new species in 2020.
