= Parartocarpus =

Scientific classification
- Kingdom: Plantae
- Clade: Tracheophytes
- Clade: Angiosperms
- Clade: Eudicots
- Clade: Rosids
- Order: Rosales
- Family: Moraceae
- Tribe: Artocarpeae
- Genus: Parartocarpus; Baill.

Species
- 2 species, see text

Genus of trees

Parartocarpus is a genus of South-East Asian trees in the family Moraceae. It is dioecious, with male and female flowers borne on separate plants.

== Species ==
The genus Parartocarpus contains the following two species:

- Parartocarpus bracteata (King) Becc.
- Parartocarpus venenosus (Zoll. & Moritzi) Becc.
