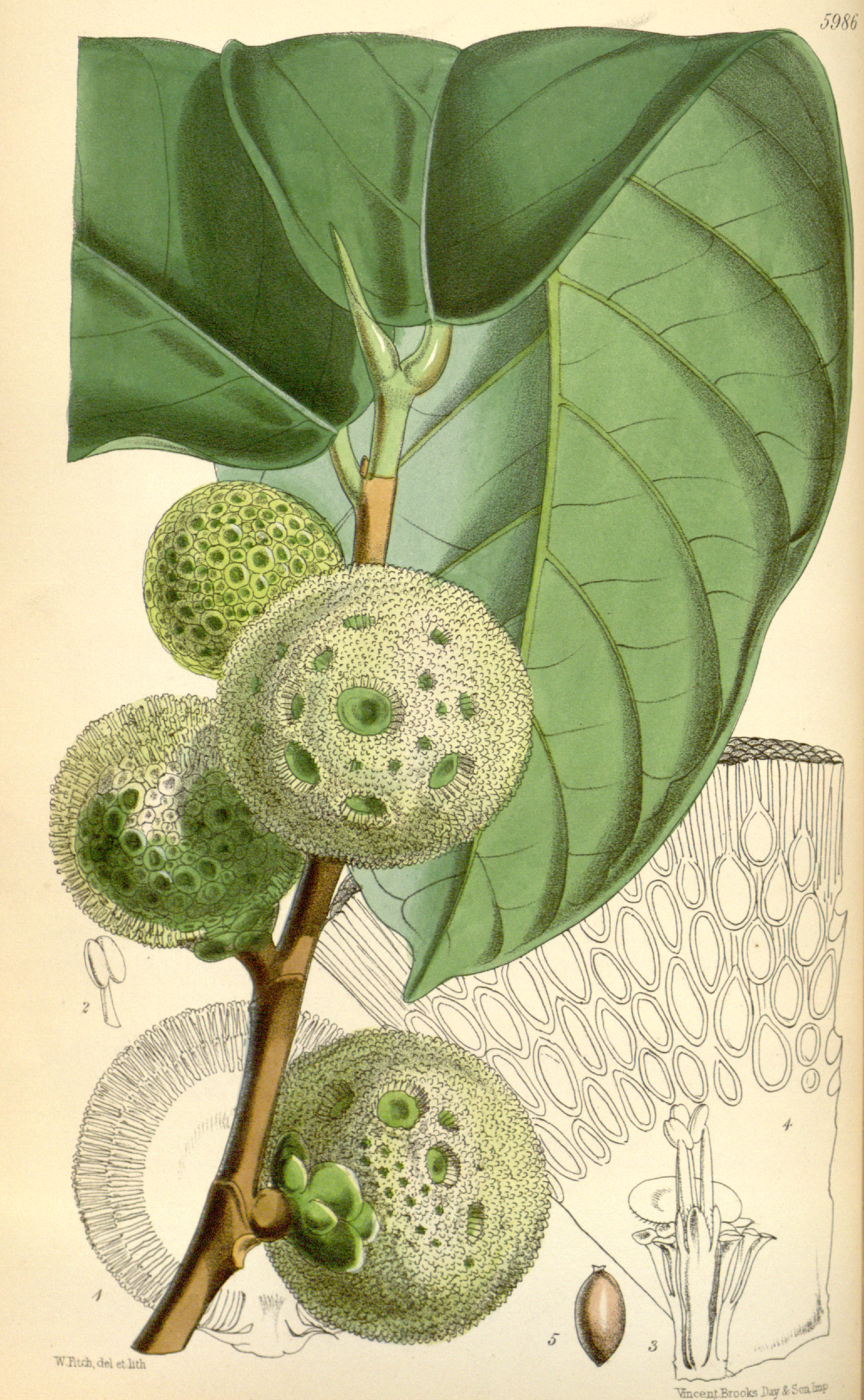
- Treculia africana

Scientific classification
- Kingdom: Plantae
- Clade: Tracheophytes
- Clade: Angiosperms
- Clade: Eudicots
- Clade: Rosids
- Order: Rosales
- Family: Moraceae
- Tribe: Artocarpeae
- Genus: Treculia; Decne. ex Trécul (1847)

Species
- 5; see text

Synonyms
- Acanthotreculia Engl. (1908)

= Treculia =

Genus of trees

Treculia is a genus of trees in the plant family Moraceae that is native to west and central Africa and Madagascar. The best-known member of the genus, Treculia africana, commonly known as the African breadfruit, is used as a food plant.

The fruits are hard and fibrous, can be the size of a volleyball and weight up to 8.5 kg. Chimpanzees have been observed to use tools to break the fruits into small pieces that they can eat.

== Species ==
Five species are accepted.

- Treculia acuminata Baill.
- Treculia africana Decne. ex Trécul
  - Treculia africana var. africana
    - Treculia africana var. africana cultivar Nutreculia Nutrecul-TRC
  - Treculia africana var. ilicifolia (Leandri) C.C.Berg
  - Treculia africana var. inversa Okafor
  - Treculia africana var. mollis (Engl.) Léonard
  - Treculia africana var. sambiranensis (Leandri) C.C.Berg
- Treculia lamiana Leandri
- Treculia obovoidea N.E.Br.
- Treculia zenkeri Engl.
