= Parartocarpus bracteata =

Scientific classification
- Kingdom: Plantae
- Clade: Tracheophytes
- Clade: Angiosperms
- Clade: Eudicots
- Clade: Rosids
- Order: Rosales
- Family: Moraceae
- Genus: Parartocarpus
- Species: P. bracteata

Binomial name
- Parartocarpus bracteata (King) Becc.

Plant species

Parartocarpus bracteata is a tree species in the family Moraceae.
