= Richmond William Hullett =

English headmaster (1843–1914)

Richmond William Hullett (15 November 1843 – 1 January 1914) was an English 19th century headmaster, explorer and plant collector. He was often associated with Singapore than Hong Kong. His fields of influence include language and education, conservation, exploration and botany in Malaysia, Borneo, Sumatra, Indonesia, and England, and his achievements have inspired Chinese scholars.

Hullett discovered the plant Bauhinia hullettii (a synonym for Bauhinia ferruginea var. ferruginea) on Mount Ophir in Malaysia. The Bauhinia, an orchid-like plant with delicate flowers, became his passion.

== Early years ==
Richmond William Hullett was born on 15 November 1843, in the parish of Allstree in Derbyshire, England. Hullett was born to John Hullett, a clergyman in the parish of Allstree who was ordained Deacon of Gloucester in 1838 and his wife Cecilia. Hullet was the third son and he had five brothers and one sister. Richmond and his brothers and sister lived in the country parsonage in Allestree, Derbyshire.

== Education ==
Hullett was sent to Rossall boarding school in Lancashire England. At Rossall he was an exceptional student particularly in mathematics. He won a scholarship to enter Trinity College Cambridge to study maths. He entered Trinity College Cambridge in 1863 and graduated in 1866 as 31st Wrangler, taking a first-class honours degree in the mathematical Tripos.

== Academic career ==
Following his graduation from Cambridge University, Hullett secured a teaching post as assistant master at the Puritan Felsted School in Essex, England. During Hullett's time there as assistant master, Hullett began to show interest in his two lifelong diversified passions; language and botany. Hullett left Felsted Grammar School in 1871 to take up a new senior post as principal of Raffles Institution in Singapore.

Hullett became the longest serving (1871–1906) headmaster of Raffles Institution and the Hullett Memorial Library, the Hullett house in the house system, as well as the Hullett block in the Raffles Institution Boarding Complex, are all named in honour of him.

In 1906, Hullet retired as principal of the Raffles Institution and became inspector of schools in the Straits settlement and director of public instruction in Singapore. He was succeeded in this post by Charles McGowan Phillips.

== Academic interest ==
Hullett was a member of a number of learned societies.

=== Straits Philosophical Society ===
Hullett was a founding member of the Straits Philosophical Society which was 1893 to engage in critical discussions on philosophy, theology, history, literature, science, and art. The society played a developmental role in the intellectual and cultural life of colonial Singapore. Its founding members were Major-General Sir Charles Warren (president), the Rev. G. M. Reith (secretary and treasurer), John Winfield Bonser, Walter Napier, Henry Nicholas Ridley (fellow plant collector and explorer), J. Bromhead Matthews, J. McKillop, D. J. Galloway (Dr), A. Knight, Tan Teck Soon, T. Shelford, G. D. Haviland (Dr), R. N. Bland, and C. W. Kynnersley. The society largely comprised the intellectual elite of the colonial administration. Active membership, which was capped at 15, was opened to Singapore residents only. Priority for admission was given to university graduates, fellows of European learned societies, and people with distinguished merit.

One of the members Tan Teck Soon was an influential Chinese scholar and former pupil of Hullett who contributed to the reformist impulse within the Chinese community in Singapore around the turn of the 20th century. In 1873, at the age of 14, Tan became the first Straits Chinese to win the Guthrie Scholarship for Chinese boys, which enabled him to go to Amoy to continue his Chinese studies. At the Raffles Institution, Tan was one of the first pupils of Hullett. Tan purchased the Daily Advertiser as a vehicle for communicating to the public their ideas about the need for reform within the Chinese community. Tan was editor and proprietor of the paper from 1890 to 1894. In it he tried to keep the local Chinese community abreast of political and cultural developments in China. Tan was involved in running the Singapore Chinese Educational Institute from 1891, the inaugural lecture for which was given by Tan's old school master, Hullett. Another of Hullett's pupils was the respected Lim Boon Keng, OBE a Chinese doctor who promoted social and educational reforms in Singapore and China. Lim Boon Keng studied medicine at Edinburgh University in the UK.

=== The Linnean Society ===
Hullett's passion for plant collecting, recording and discovery of new plant species, led him to him being appointed a Fellow of The Linnean Society (FLS). He remained a member until 1909. The Linnean Society of London is among the oldest of London's Learned Societies and is the world's oldest active organisation devoted exclusively to natural history.

=== The Straits branch of the Royal Asiatic Society ===
Hullett made many contributions to the Straits branch of the Royal Asiatic Society. Hullett's friend and fellow plant collector Henry Nicholas Ridley was also amongst its council members. Apart from enjoying elite patronage, the Society during the colonial period received government grants, donations from the Sultans of the Malay states, Franking privileges, government provision of premises and facilities for printing and map-making.

== Hullett's achievements ==
Whenever Hullett had the opportunity he would embark on expeditions to collect and record plants throughout the 1880s and 1890s. A number of his significant plant discoveries were found on Mt Ophir (4,186 ft; 1,276 m) in Malaysia. Although today Mount Ophir is one of the most popular and most climbed mountains, in Hullett's day it was a significant trek and often a dangerous expedition.

== Hullett's plants ==
Another important plant brought back to China from Mount Ophir by Hullett was a variant of Impatiens (Busy Lizzie).

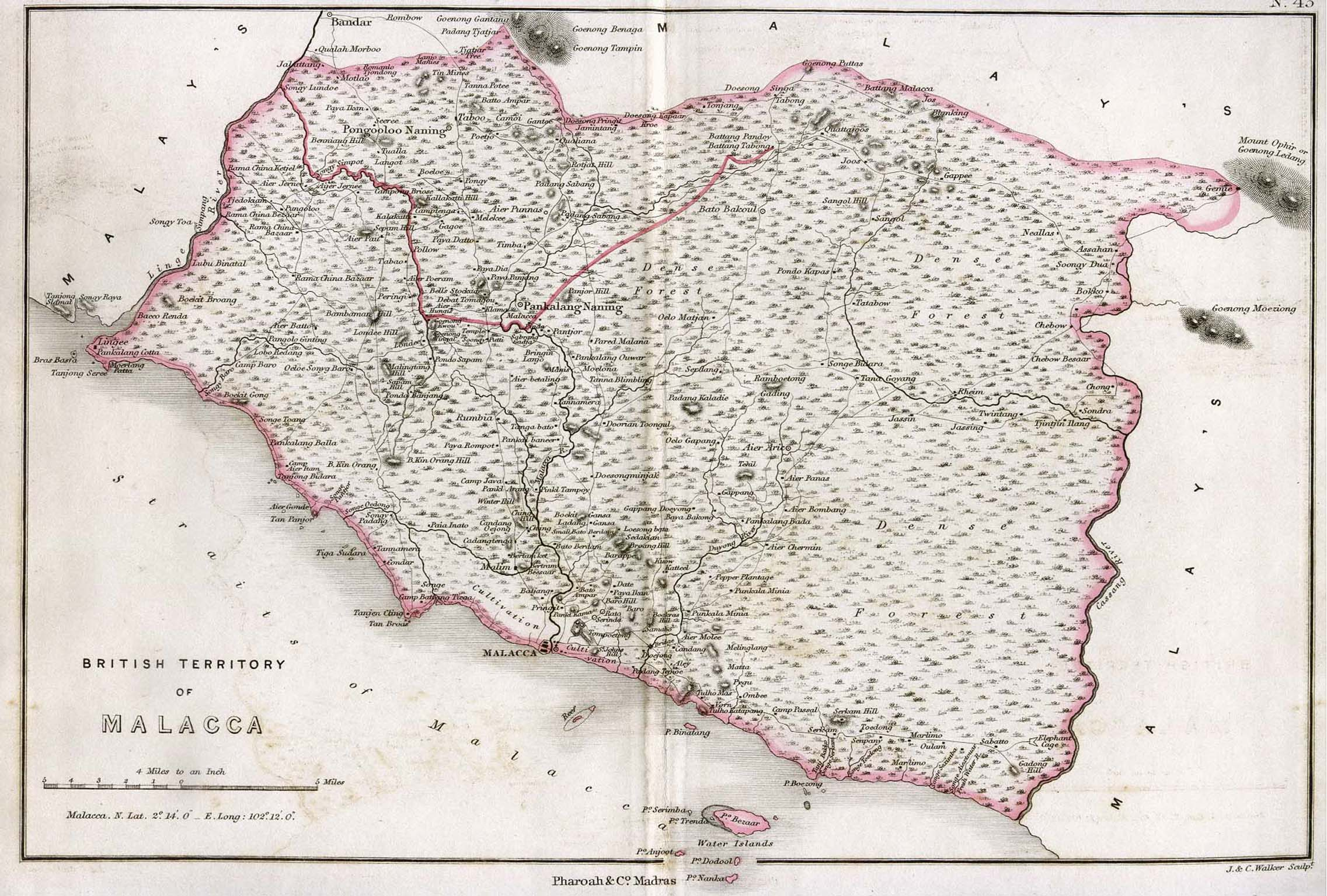
Where Hullett found the Busy Lizzie

In 1956 in a seeming case of ‘plant envy’ it appears that Hullett was blamed for the inadvertent release to other areas of Southeast Asia Linaria alpina. The following is an extract taken from the original article which apportions blame to Hullett because of the use of ‘old rough drying paper’ to transport the seedlings.

"Another singular case of distribution, too strange to be true, is that of Linaria alpina DC. found on Mt Ophir in Malaya, by HULLETT. The sheet contains one miserable 5 cm long flowering branch which can exactly be matched with European specimens. It is glued on the sheet and Mr VAN DER WERFF did not succeed in finding on a tiny fragment, aerial diatoms which might give a clue. Although the locality was very well known in the field, RIDLEY and nobody else has succeeded in recollect Linaria alpina there. The habitat, a wet place would ecologically be abnormal. Personally I am convinced that this specimen has been erroneously localized, the error in all probability having arisen by the use of old, rough drying paper which had been employed formerly in Europe and was brought along to Malaya and to which this tiny specimen adhered and escaped attention until it was loosened with the Mt Ophir collection of HULLETT"

== Citrus Halimii ==
One of the most significant cases of lost plants is that of the wild Malaysian citrus tree believed to be 12 million years old (now endangered). Citrus halimii (a close relative of the kumquat and pomelo variety of citrus), was collected by William Tatton Egerton on Mount Ophir, 28 December 1902. In a letter to Henry Nicholas Ridley, Egerton writes:

Dear Ridley,

I send to you by Hullett some leaves and fruit of a mountain lemon or citron found growing in primaeval jungle at a height of 2200 feet about 2 miles from the Burkit Tangga Pass to Jelebu. It may well be unknown but I expect to hear that you know it well.

Yours sincerely,

W. Egerton

28/12/02

The Residency,

Seremban

Prior to human cultivation the genus citrus originated in South East Asia and consisted of just a few specimens. The leaves and fruit were brought back by Hullett but they seemed to have been ‘lost’ for over 70 years, nobody knows quite what happened to them. However, when the seedling was ‘rediscovered’ in the Herbarium of the Botanic Gardens Singapore, it was documented, and named in 1973. Erroneous labelling of some specimens may account for the seeming disappearance of some varieties of plants. Important varieties of Hullett's collection remain to this day in the Herbarium of the Botanic Gardens Singapore. Citrus halimii, was named after the King of Malaysia His Majesty Duli Yang Maha Mulia Seri Paduka Baginda Yang DiPertuan Agong of Malaysia.

Hullett and Ridley collected plants on the granite island of Pulau Uban, Singapore. The original vegetation probably consisted of lowland forest and mangrove swamps. Today much of the original vegetation has been cleared. Nearly 600 out of 2,257 native plants are now extinct; deforestation and disturbance have been the main causes of plant species extinction in Singapore. During Hullett's collection on the island he discovered the Canavalis bean, seeds of which are in the Hong Kong Botanical Gardens, they were recorded in 1922 in Stanley and Lantao Island.

== Macaranga hullettii (The Ant Plant) ==
Macaranga, which occurs predominantly in peninsular Malaysia, Borneo, and Sumatra, is the world's largest genus of pioneer trees. It grows in small gaps in forests, along riverbanks, roadsides, and in logged areas. Macaranga hullettii tree species known from Maritime Southeast Asia are colonised by specific ants which are required for the successful pollination of this specific Macaranga tree. Without Hullett's discovery of one of the popular Euphorbia varieties of plants we may not have the distribution in Southeast Asia which we enjoy today, specifically continuation of M. hullettii is most important for the colony of tiny ants which require this to survive. Hullett spent a collected plants in Indonesia particularly in Sindang Laya in Java. Here Hullett found a species, Erechtites valerianifolia, which is known for its medicinal properties and its ability to induce sleep.

== Personal life ==
Hullett was the author of a book entitled "English sentences with equivalents in colloquial Malay" published in 1887.

Hullett died in Wandsworth, London UK on January 1, 1914.

== Legacy ==
In 1888, King ex Hook.f. named a genus of flowering plants (belonging to the family Moraceae) Hullettia in his honour.

Hullett's legacy has stretched beyond Southeast Asia, but his major contributions were to Hong Kong, Sumatra, Malaysia, Borneo, Indonesia and Singapore. Recent field studies in Hong Kong rediscovered ferns which may have been discovered by Hullett. The earliest reported survey of Hong Kong plants was in 1841 documented by Bentham in 1861.
