= Andy Ong =

Singaporean businessperson

Andy Ong Siew Kwee (born 6 August 1970) is a Singaporean entrepreneur, author and property investor. He became a millionaire by the age of 26 making him one of the youngest such in Singapore. Ong oversees businesses in education, training, print media and property investments which post an annual turnover of S$100 million.

Ong founded the Entrepreneur's Resource Centre (ERC) Holdings. In Ong's term as founder and CEO of ERC thus far, he has established ERC Institute, BIGWork, BIGFund and BIGFitness.

== Early life and education ==
Ong was educated at Raffles Institution, St Andrew's Junior College and the National University of Singapore. From the age of 15 – 24, he worked as a helper at a kitchen in Holland village restaurant where he chopped vegetables from 6pm – 11pm daily after school.

== Career ==
=== Asia Financial Planning Journal ===
Upon graduation from university, Ong worked as a managing editor at a publishing firm until he was retrenched in the 1997 financial crisis. Following this, he founded the financial journal Asia Financial Planning Journal, which broke even within 2 weeks. Ong sold the business in 2003 to focus on developing ERC.

=== Entrepreneur's Resource Centre ===
In 2001, Ong founded incubator and business consultancy, Entrepreneur's Resource Centre (ERC). ERC was to be a hub to train, fund and mentor entrepreneurs in Singapore. ERC was awarded a grant by Singapore's Economic Development Board (EDB) under the SEEDS programme to incubate firms.

=== Entrepreneur's Resource Centre Institute ===
In 2003, Ong led ERC Holdings to expand into education, establishing ERC Institute, a private education institute. Students can enroll in courses to attain certification from its university partners, such as University of Greenwich, Embry-Riddle Aeronautical University and University of Wolverhampton. Ong personally mentors students with viable business plans at ERCI.

=== BIGWork ===
In 2016, Ong, as CEO of ERC, designed BIGWork with Yen Ong, founder of the co-working space. It is the first Southeast Asian co-working space to offer a multi-city pass across cities in Bangkok, Ho Chi Minh and Singapore. BIGWork offers entrepreneurs a co-working space and community at lower costs.

=== BIGFund ===
In 2016, Ong launched BIGFund, an accelerator programme aimed at helping start-ups commercialise business ideas across Southeast Asia. BIGFund serves as an extension to ERCI students to gain access to the fundamental resources for market penetration.

=== Board Advisory Roles ===
In 2006, Ong who sat on the board of 15 private and public-listed companies, is a certified financial planner and was the founding president of the Financial Planning Association of Singapore. ERC now has a presence in various countries such as Singapore, Thailand and China and an ERC Institute campus in Vietnam.

== Investments ==
Ong also assisted an ailing quick service food company that was on the verge of closing down because of cash flow problems due to over-expansion. It was at this time that Ong entered as a consultant and purchased a stake in the company and reformatted the food chain's entire marketing plan. In three weeks, with an adjustment in awareness campaigns and budget, they made a profit.

Ong began his property investments with the purchase of two shophouses at Circular Road and Telok Ayer. He owns and rents a total of three properties including the Prime Centre at Middle Road which was initially appraised at $103 million by realtors Knight Frank.

== Books ==
Ong is the author or co-author of several books in Singapore and Malaysia which include:

- A Singapore Guide to Personal Financial Planning, 1999, ISBN 981-04-1263-0
- Unit Trust in Singapore, 2000, ISBN 981-04-2689-5
- Financial Sutra for Malaysians, ISBN 981-04-7756-2
- Investing in Unit Trusts, 1997, ISBN 981-00-9923-1
- Planning for Your Financial Life, 2002, ISBN 981-04-0680-0
- Personal Financial Planning in Malaysia, ISBN 983-40670-0-3
- Directory of Personal Investment 1998, ISBN 981-00-9613-5
- Maniac!, 2004, ISBN 981-05-2370-X

Ong was the Lead Author and Editor-in-Chief of Singapore's first financial planning textbook, a project titled A Singapore Guide to Personal Financial Planning (1999, ISBN 981-04-1263-0), which was published by Financial Perspectives and co-published by RMIT University. This project involved academics and practitioners of finance in Singapore.

== Legal Controversies ==
In January 2013, Sakae Holdings filed a suit against Ong for allegedly breaching duties when he was a non-executive director of the company, among other allegations. This came about when an international accounting firm commissioned by Sakae's executive chairman and CEO Douglas Foo to investigate Griffin Real Estate Investment Holdings. The firm reported that transactions had not been properly disclosed to Sakae and Foo, who is also the company's representative on Griffin's board.

In February, the Sakae board asked Ong to tender his resignation within seven days. In a statement on 19 February 2013, Ong rejected the allegations and explained the use of the $34 million in question. On 3 May, Sakae withdrew the application to sue Ong and Ho Yew Kong, both former directors of Griffin, on behalf of Griffin. Following the withdrawal, Sakae was ordered by the court to pay more than $100,000 in legal costs and other fees relating to the two lawsuits it dropped.

Sakae filed a separate suit in April against Ong and two other men for breaching his fiduciary duties, including siphoning funds of $26 million from Griffon Real Estate Investment Holdings, of which Sakae was a minority shareholder.

On 8 April 2017, the courts found against the three men and ordered them to pay $35 million to Griffon, and Ong was ordered to pay $2.64 million to Sakae. On 3 August 2018, Ong, with three other men, was again taken to court over criminal breach of trust offenses committed between 2011 and 2016, including allegedly transferring $8 million to his personal accounts and an unauthorized transfer of $15.8 million. Ong was offered bail at $700,000.
