= William Henry Macleod Read =

William Henry Macleod Read (7 February 1819 – 10 May 1909) was an active participant in the commercial, political and social life of Singapore and the Malay states between 1841 and 1887.

== Early life ==
Read was born in Scotland, the son of Christopher Rideout Read, co-partner of A. L. Johnston & Company.

== Career ==
In 1841, when Read was 22, he travelled to Singapore to take his father's place at A. L. Johnston & Company, Singapore's leading merchant company at that time. His father was retiring and returned to England the following year in 1842. Alexander Laurie Johnston, his father's co-partner, retired and left Singapore in December.

Read headed the company until his own retirement in 1887.

=== Civil career ===
The Singapore Turf Club, the island's home of horse racing, began as Read's Singapore Sporting Club on 4 October 1842. Marking the 24th anniversary of the founding of Singapore by Sir Stamford Raffles, the first races were held on 23 and 25 February 1843. Read himself won the first Derby, called the Singapore Cup, and took home the prize money of $150. In March of that year, he organised the Colony's first rowing regatta.

In January 1845, at a public meeting, Read put forward a motion proposing that municipal assessment funds (see Act XIII of 1839 allowing for an assessment fund to be used for municipal purposes) be controlled by one person appointed by government and two persons appointed by ratepayers. The motion was carried by a large majority. However a new bill was passed (Act IX of 1848 that provided for two officials and three non-officials, all nominated by the Governor to administer the funds.

In 1854, Read was appointed Special Constable to deal with ethnic riots between the Hokkien and Cantonese communities in Singapore. He is credited with using his powers of negotiation and mediation to settle the conflict. Also in 1854, William Read was the first volunteer of the Singapore Rifle Corps, a militia unit in which he remained active for 25 years.

Between 28 March 1851 and 16 January 1874, Read served as the honorary consul for Sweden–Norway in Singapore. In 1857 Read, who was fluent in French, was made consul for the Netherlands in Singapore, a post he held until 1885. For his service as the Dutch consul, he was awarded the Order of the Netherlands Lion (Knight Commander). By 1865, Read was Chairman of the Singapore Chamber of Commerce.

In 1868, Read was appointed Companion of the Order of St Michael and St George, by Queen Victoria.

In 1873, during the Larut Wars, Tan Kim Ching, a local Chinese businessman who was also a member of the Ghee Hin secret society and a supporter of the Raja Muda Abdullah of Perak and the Ghee Hin in Larut, introduced Abdullah to Read to help resolve the Larut Wars and the disputed succession of the sultanship of Perak. Tan, together with Read, drafted a letter to Governor Andrew Clarke, which Abdullah signed, in which Abdullah expressed his desire to place Perak under British protection, and "to have a man of sufficient abilities to show him a good system of government."

Read had ongoing involvements in regional politics, including the establishment of the British Colonial presence in Borneo through co-chairmanship of the British North Borneo Provisional Association in 1881. The charter of the British North Borneo Company, lists Read, of 25 Durham Terrace, in the Country of Middlesex, as one of its petitioners.

In 1887, Read lay the first cylinder of Read Bridge, named after him, over the Singapore River.

Read was the first treasurer of the National Library, trusteeship of Singapore Institution, and founding of the first Sailor's Home (which he was appointed Honorary Secretary).

=== Political career ===
Read was made a member of the Legislative Council of the Straits Settlements by Royal appointment. During his tenure in the British Straits Settlement, Singapore passed from control of British India to the British Colonial Office in 1867.

== Freemason ==
Read was also active as a Freemason, being the second person to be initiated to the Masonic Lodge Zetland in the East and soon becoming its Worshipful Master. He eventually rose to become leader of the Freemasons' Eastern Archipelago, District Grand Lodge.

On 27 September 1878, a land grant was issued in favour of R. W. Bro. Read, District Grand Master, and his successors in office for the use of Masons under the United Grand Lodge of Antient, Free and Accepted Masons of England. Read laid the foundation stone for the new building Masonic Hall on 14 April 1879. The new hall was consecrated on 27 December 1879 by the District Grand Master, Read.

Read also officiated over Masonic ceremonies which included the laying of the foundation stone of Raffles Lighthouse in 1854.

Read was eventually succeeded in his role as District Grand Master by Major Samuel Dunlop in 1885.

== Personal life ==
Read was married to Marjory Cumming-Read, daughter of banker John Cumming of Forres, Scotland. She died aged 21 on 24 June 1849.

Read returned to Britain in February 1887. He had spent almost 46 years in Singapore.

In 1901, Read published his memoirs "Play and Politics, Recollections of Malaya by an Old Resident".

Read died on 10 May 1909, aged 91, and was buried on 13 May 1909 at Brompton Cemetery, London.

== Legacy ==
In 1896, North Street and South Street in Clarke Quay, which were besides Read bridge, were renamed as Read street after Read.

In 1910, the Governor of Singapore unveiled a memorial tablet to the memory of Read in St. Andrew's Cathedral, Singapore, for his outstanding contributions to Singapore. This tablet dedication can be still seen on the left side, behind the main entrance door of the church.

== See also ==
- Klang War
