= Daphne Chia =

Former Singaporean rhythmic gymnast

Daphne Theresa Chia
- Born: 26 September 1996 (age 29) Indianapolis, United States

Gymnastics career
- Discipline: Rhythmic gymnastics
- Country represented: Singapore (2013–2015)
- Former coach: Zhu Xiaoping

Daphne Theresa Chia (born 26 September 1996) is a former Singaporean rhythmic gymnast. She represented Singapore at international competitions from 2013 to 2015.

== Early life and education ==
Chia was born on 26 September 1996 in Indianapolis, United States. She attended Raffles Girls' School, and then Raffles Institution in Singapore. Chia was a medical student at University of Cambridge.

== Career ==
Chia started training as a rhythmic gymnast at the age of nine. In 2009, Chia represented her secondary school in the national Rhythmic Gymnastics Championships. She started representing Singapore in international competitions since 2010, starting with the ASEAN School Games 2010 in which her rhythmic gymnast team was placed second. In 2013, Chia represented Singapore in Asian Rhythmic Gymnastics Championships and World Rhythmic Gymnastics Championships. In 2014, Chia represented Singapore in 2014 Commonwealth Games – women's rhythmic team all-around gymnastics and was placed eighth. In 2015, Chia represented Singapore in 2015 Southeast Asian Games – women's rhythmic individual all-around gymnastics event and was placed sixth. She had retired from the sport thereafter and chose to further her studies at University of Cambridge.

== Personal life ==
Chia renounced her US citizenship in 2018.
