= Yeo Swee Hee =

Singaporean businessman

Yeo Swee Hee (Chinese: 杨瑞喜; 1861 – 10 October 1909) was the Singaporean proprietor of the Cold Storage depot, a land owner, a mining contractor, a general merchant and a commission agent.

== Early life and education ==
Yeo was born in Singapore in 1861 as the son of Yeo Kwan, and attended Raffles Institution.

== Career ==
Yeo became employed at Huttenbach & Co. in 1885, and stayed with the company for 27 years, eventually rising to the position of general assistant. He was also the proprietor of the Cold Storage depot on Orchard Road. He owned a large amount of land, and was also a general merchant and commission agent. He was on the committees of the Straits Chinese British Association and the Anglo-Chinese Free School. He was also a trustee of various other schools. He was an honorary member of the Singapore Volunteer Corps and a member of the Straits Chinese Recreation Club.

== Personal life and death ==
Yeo was married and had at least four sons and six daughters. He died on 10 October 1909 a few months after his health had begun to deteriorate.

Swee Hee Lane was named after him.
