= Abdul Ghani Hamid =

Singaporean writer, poet and artist

- Born: 13 April 1933; Singapore
- Died: 13 April 2014 (aged 81); Singapore
- Education: Telok Kurau English School; Raffles Institution
- Known for: Abstract painting, poetry, writing
- Movement: Modern art

Abdul Ghani Abdul Hamid (13 April 1933–13 April 2014), commonly known as Abdul Ghani Hamid or A. Ghani Hamid; also known by his pen name Lazuardi, was a Singaporean writer, poet, and artist. Writing primarily in Malay, Abdul Ghani produced a large body of poems, plays, short stories, and newspaper articles, further participating in more than 60 art exhibitions since 1950 with his abstract paintings. He received the Anugerah Tun Seri Lanang in 1997, the Cultural Medallion for literature in 1999, and the Southeast Asia Write Award in 1998.

== Education and personal life ==
Abdul Ghani was born on 13 April 1933, in Kampung Siglap (now Kampung Bahru), East Coast Road, Singapore. Abdul Ghani was educated in both English and Malay, first at Telok Kurau English School, and later completing his secondary education at Raffles Institution. While studying at Raffles Institution, he sent poems and articles he had written to local Malay newspapers and magazines and held his inaugural art exhibition during a Youth Festival.

== Career ==
After his studies, Abdul Ghani worked as an apprentice at the Electrical Department of Keppel Harbour, after which, he found a job as a clerk at the Public Utilities Board, then known as the Singapore Municipality. He would only leave the job in 1988. Though he had full-time work and was a father of four, he made time to write and paint. Beyond painting and writing, Abdul Ghani also pursued photography.

Abdul Ghani's writings have been published in Malaysian literary journals, Dewan Sastera and Dewan Bahasa. He further wrote for an arts column in the Singapore Malay language Sunday newspaper Berita Minggu in the ’70s, contributing comic strips such as Mat Dalang to the newspaper and other Malay magazines under the pen name Lazuardi. In 1956, the Angkatan Pelukis Muda (Young Artists' Movement) was founded and headed by Abdul Ghani, though it would be quickly dissolved after it was unable to gather enough support. In 1960, Abdul Ghani published Sekilas Pandang Senilukis Dan Perkembangannya (A Glimpse of the Arts and its Development), which has come to be seen as a significant guide for the history of Singapore Malay arts.

In 1962, he co-founded the Angkatan Pelukis Aneka Daya (APAD, Artists of Various Resources) alongside Muhammad Ali Sabran, S. Mohdir, Ahmin Haji Noh, Hamidah M. F. Suhaimi and Mustafa Yassin. The association organises solo and group exhibitions, taking part in collaborations with other cultural groups, art societies, and institutions, both locally and regionally. APAD continues to exhibit works by Malay artists today.

In 1990, he wrote the publication Seni Indah Masjid Di Singapura (Art of Mosques in Singapore). He was awarded the Anugerah Tun Sri Lanang by the Majlis Bahasa Melayu Singapura (Singapore Malay Language Council) in 1998, also receiving the S.E.A. Write Award the same year. For his contributions to literature in Singapore, Abdul Ghani was honoured with the Cultural Medallion for literature in 1999.

Abdul Ghani suffered from a stroke in 2008, with his health declining after. He died from pneumonia on his 81st birthday on 13 April 2014.

== Works ==
Abdul Ghani Hamid, The Face in Meditation, 1975, Oil on canvas, 61 x 86 cm, Collection of National Gallery Singapore.

=== Art ===
Abdul Ghani's poetry has been said to be “deeply metaphysical,” and he has further described having “transfer[red] the same feeling from [his] poetry to [his] paintings”, with his art and writing often sharing similar subjects and titles. Abdul Ghani was one of the early Singapore-based artists to employ abstraction in paintings. His 1957 painting Mata Dan Hati attracted criticism, with detractors believing that modernist influences in painting were not beneficial to local art. Responding to critiques, Abdul Ghani identified abstraction as a technique that was not solely from the West, highlighting the presence of abstraction in the tradition of calligraphy. Abdul Ghani continued to explore abstractions that made “allusions to the empirical”, for instance, in his 1973 painting Billet-Doux (Surat Cinta).

Another example is his 1975 abstract painting, The Face in Meditation, which depicts a face that appears to be masked, with contorted limbs stretching across the canvas, visually reminiscent of batik with its strong outlines and bold colours. Within the context of modern art in Singapore, his work has been discussed in relation to the rise of Abstraction from the 50s and 60s onwards, with Singaporean artists engaging with Internationalism, that is, the proliferation of international artistic movements such as Abstract expressionism, which advanced ideas of universal aesthetics.

His works are in the collections of the National Gallery Singapore and the Galeri Shah Alam in Selangor, Malaysia.

=== Books ===
Below is a select list of books by Abdul Ghani.

- A. Ghani Hamid (1960). Sekilas Pandang Senilukis Dan Perkembangannya (A Glimpse of the Arts and its Development).
- A. Ghani Hamid; Sulaiman Jeem (1988). Mengenang Pak Zubir (Remembering Zubir Said). Singapore: Pustaka Melayu Publisher. ISBN 9810006365.
- A. Ghani Hamid (1990). Seni indah masjid di Singapura (Art of Mosques in Singapore). Singapore: Angkatan Pelukis Aneka Daya.
- A. Ghani Hamid (1991). An Artist's Note. Singapore: Angkatan Pelukis Aneka Daya. ISBN 9810031823. A book tracing the development of the visual arts after the Second World War, the formation of the APAD in 1962 till the 1990s.
- A. Ghani Hamid (2001). Delima Merah (Red Pomegranate). Singapore: Angkatan Pelukis Aneka Daya. ISBN 9810436661. A novellette in Malay.

=== Plays ===
Below is a select list of plays and dramatic works written by Abdul Ghani.

- Pengembara (1971), a dance drama based on poem of the same title.
- Wak Cantuk (1973), Perkumpulan Seni, Singapore.
- Cincin Bukan Ikatan (1978), a pantomime based on poem of the same title.
- Desa Ini Hatiku (1980), Drama Festival, Singapore.
- Berburu di Padang Datar (1982), Drama Festival, Singapore.
- Wak Cantuk (1988), 32nd Anniversary of Perkumpulan Seni, Singapore.
- Sejambak Ragam Hayat (1992), 25-part radio drama, Singapore Broadcasting Corporation.
- Enrique Anak Melayu (1994), Perkumpulan Seni, Singapore.

=== Poetry anthologies ===
Below is a select list of poetry anthologies by Abdul Ghani.

- A. Ghani Hamid (1964). Jalinan Rasa (Weave of Feelings). Singapore: Pustaka Melayu.
- A. Ghani Hamid (1988). A Journey with No End. Singapore: Perkumpulan Seni. ISBN 9810402929.
