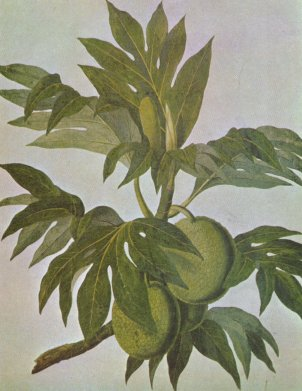
- Sydney Parkinson's original illustration of Artocarpus altilis, the species upon which the tribe is based.

Scientific classification
- Kingdom: Plantae
- Clade: Tracheophytes
- Clade: Angiosperms
- Clade: Eudicots
- Clade: Rosids
- Order: Rosales
- Family: Moraceae
- Tribe: Artocarpeae; Lam. & DC.

Genera
- Artocarpus J.R.Forster & G.Forster; Batocarpus H.Karst. Clarisia Ruiz & Pavón; Hullettia King; Parartocarpus Baillon; Prainea King; Treculia Decne. ex Trécul

= Artocarpeae =

Tribe of flowering plants

Artocarpeae is a tribe within the plant family Moraceae. It includes 7 to 12 genera and 70 to 87 species including Artocarpus altilis, the breadfruit.

== Description ==
Species in the Artocarpeae are tropical trees or shrubs which, like all members of the Moraceae, produce latex. Most are dioecious, although some are monoecious. The male and female inflorescences include a variety of elongate or compact structures. The Artocarpeae is the least homogeneous of the five tribes that make up the Moraceae.

== Taxonomy ==
The tribe is based on the genus Artocarpus, the largest and best-known genus in the group. The first post-Linnaean description of the species was done by Sydney Parkinson during James Cook's first voyage to the Pacific. Parkinson, an artist employed by Joseph Banks, died on the return leg of the voyage and his descriptions were published posthumously by his brother Stanfield Parkinson in 1773 in A Journal of a Voyage to the South Seas. Parkinson named the species Sitodium altile. Three years later, Johann Reinhold Forster and Georg Forster published a description of the species using the name Artocarpus communis. Over the next 160 years the name Artocarpus was much more widely used, leading to its preservation as a conserved name.

== Distribution ==
Members of the Artocarpeae are native to tropical Asia, the Indo-Pacific, southern Africa, Madagascar and the Neotropics. In addition, members of the genus Artocarpus are cultivated throughout the tropics, especially Artocarpus altilis, the breadfruit, and A. heterophyllus, the jackfruit.

The native range of Artocarpus, the largest genus, includes tropical Asia, Indonesia, New Guinea, the Philippines and Micronesia. Artocarpus altilis, was introduced across Oceania by Polynesians colonists. Batocarpus and Clarisia are native to the Neotropics. Hullettia is native to Southeast Asia, Parartocarpus and Prainea (sometimes included in Artocarpus) to the Indo-Pacific and Treculia to tropical Africa and Madagascar.

== Genera ==
- Artocarpus – Breadfruit, jackfruit
- Batocarpus
- Clarisia
- Hullettia

in a new tribe parartocarpeae

- Parartocarpus

in a new tribe parartocarpeae

- Prainea
- Treculia
