= Charlie Phillips =

Charlie Phillips may refer to:

- Charlie Phillips (American football) (born 1952), retired American football safety
- Charlie Phillips (footballer) (1910–1969), Welsh international footballer
- Charlie Phillips (ice hockey) (1917–2005), Canadian ice hockey defenceman
- Charlie Phillips (photographer) (born 1944), Jamaican-born restaurateur, photographer, and documenter of black London
- Charlie Phillips (producer) (born 1980), head of documentary acquisition and production at The Guardian
- Charlie Phillips (singer) (born 1937), American country music singer

== See also ==
- Charles Phillips (disambiguation)
- Charley Phillips (born 2003), English cricketer
