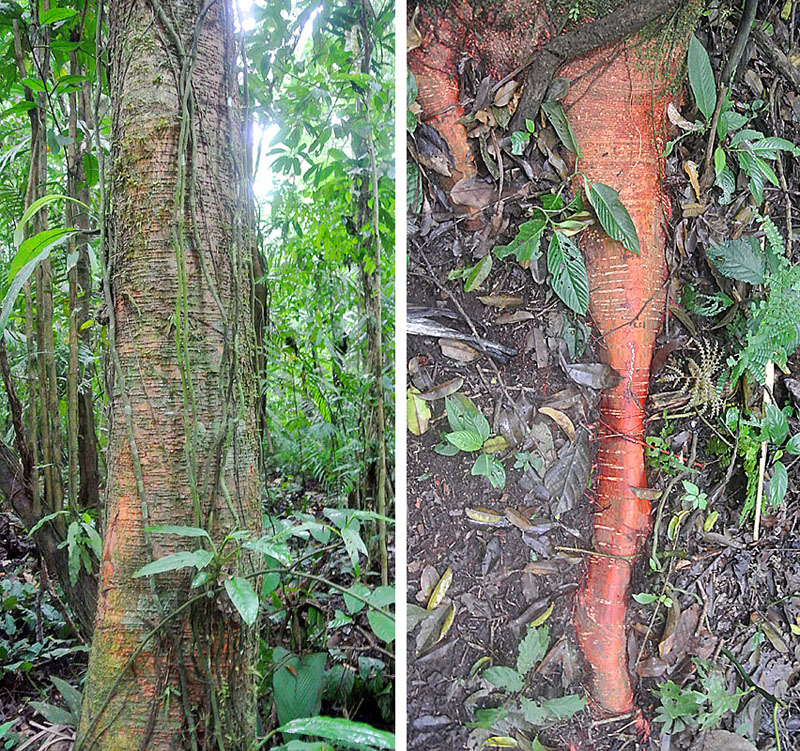
- Clarisia racemosa

Scientific classification
- Kingdom: Plantae
- Clade: Tracheophytes
- Clade: Angiosperms
- Clade: Eudicots
- Clade: Rosids
- Order: Rosales
- Family: Moraceae
- Tribe: Artocarpeae
- Genus: Clarisia; Ruiz & Pav. (1794)

Species
- 4 species, see text

Synonyms
- Acanthinophyllum Allemão (1858); Aliteria Benoist (1929); Sahagunia Liebm. (1851); Soaresia Allemão (1857), nom. rej.

= Clarisia =

Genus of flowering plants

Clarisia is a genus of trees in the family Moraceae, native to North and South America, ranging from Mexico to Bolivia.

== Taxonomy ==
The genus Clarisia contains the following species:

- Clarisia biflora Ruiz & Pav.
- Clarisia ilicifolia (Spreng.) Lanj. & Rossbach
- Clarisia mexicana (Liebm.) Lanj.
- Clarisia racemosa Ruiz & Pav.
