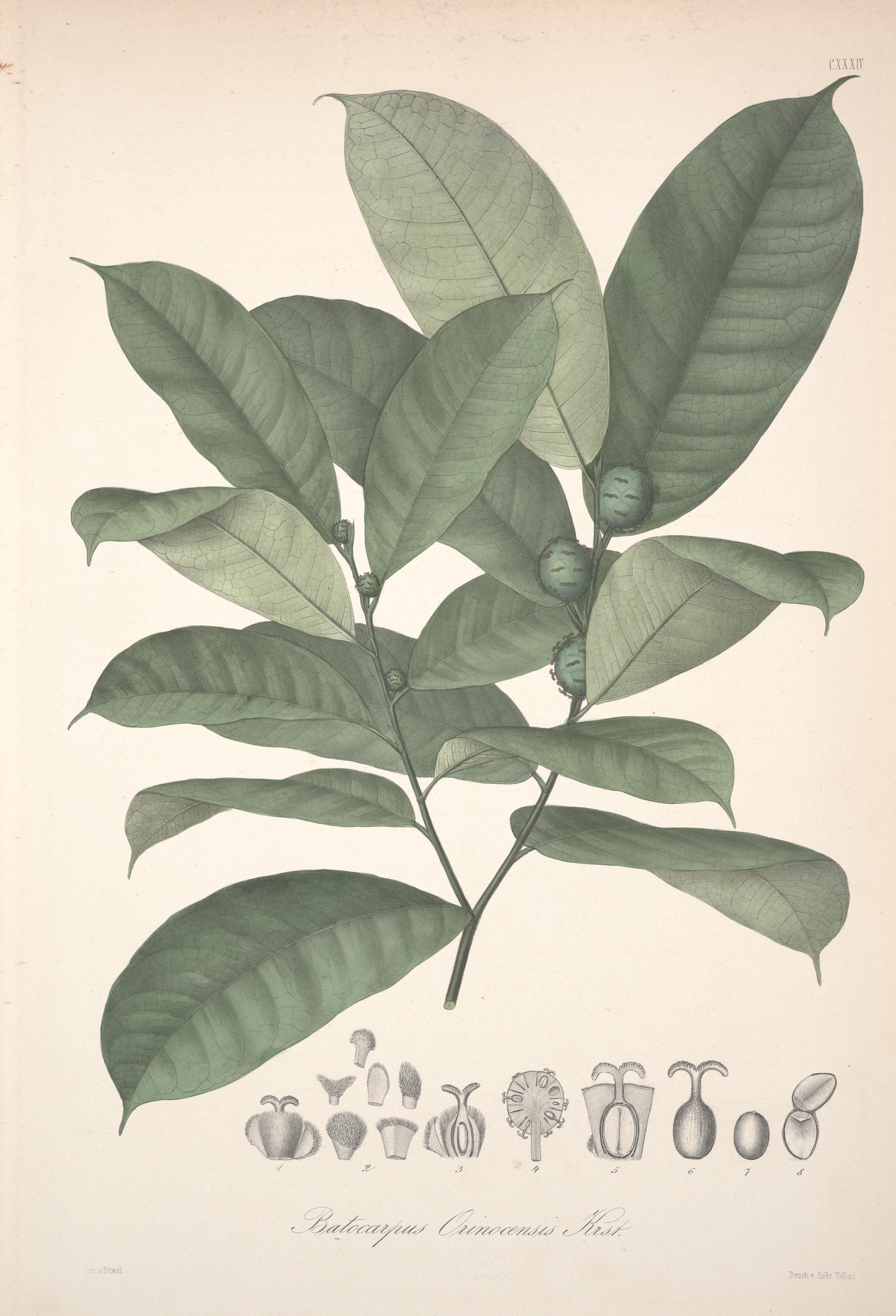
- Batocarpus orinocensis

Scientific classification
- Kingdom: Plantae
- Clade: Tracheophytes
- Clade: Angiosperms
- Clade: Eudicots
- Clade: Rosids
- Order: Rosales
- Family: Moraceae
- Tribe: Artocarpeae
- Genus: Batocarpus; H.Karst. (1863)

Species
- 3 species, see text

Synonyms
- Anonocarpus Ducke (1922)

= Batocarpus =

Genus of flowering plants

Batocarpus is a genus of trees in the family Moraceae, native to North and South America (from Costa Rica to Bolivia).

== Taxonomy ==
The genus Batocarpus contains the following species:

- Batocarpus amazonicus (Ducke) Fosberg
- Batocarpus costaricensis Standl. & L.O.Williams
- Batocarpus orinocensis H.Karst.
