= Charles Gregory Pestana =

Singaporean usher

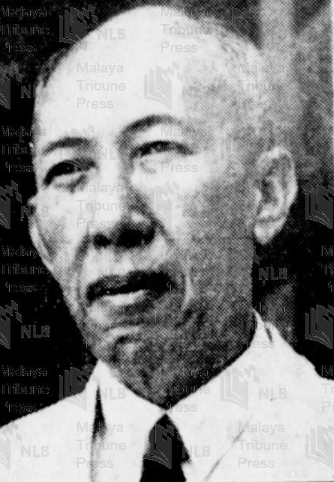
Pestana in 1937

Charles Gregory Pestana (1886 – 3 February 1941), was an usher of the Second Magistrate's Court in Singapore.

== Biography ==
Pestana was born in 1886. He was educated at Raffles Institution. He became a clerk at the Civil District Court in 1904 and transferred to the Second Magistrate's Court as an usher in 1919. He was frequently known as "Charlie".

In 1928, he received a letter of commendation from then Chief Police Officer C. H. Sansom for making an arrest on Veerasamy Road. He received a letter of appreciation from then Chief Police Officer Lloyd Wynne in 1936 for an arrest in the district of Newton. He was lauded for arresting habitual thieves that helped lower crime, for which he received letters of commendation.

Pestana retired from his job as an usher at the Second Magistrate's Court in 1937 after having spent 32-1/2 years in government service. He did so due to his deteriorating health. Upon his retirement, the Morning Tribune noted that it was "doubtful whether an usher with such wide experience in court work can be replaced. The Second Police Court curriculum was carried out without a hitch throughout his tenure..."

== Personal life ==
Pestana was married. Together, he and his wife had eight children. He was a fan of soccer.

Pestana died on 3 February 1941 at his residence in Telok Kurau. He was 54. His funeral was held on the same day at Bidadari Cemetery, with a service at the Church of St. Joseph.
