= Freemasonry in Singapore =

Freemasonry is a fraternal organisation that operates worldwide, with a Masonic Hall in Singapore on Coleman Street, amongst various lodges and groups in the nation.

== History ==
The first Freemason lodge in Southeast Asia was established in the British Bencoolen (now Bengkulu, Indonesia) in 1765. The first lodge in Singapore, Zetland in the East Lodge No. 508 E. C., was established on 8 December 1845 at Armenian Street, later relocating to a newly constructed Masonic Hall at Coleman Street in 1879. The Lodge of St. George No. 1152 is the second oldest Lodge in the Masonic District of the Eastern Archipelago, having been formed in 1867. It celebrated its 150th anniversary in 2017.

The Hall persists to the modern day, having undergone numerous renovations and restorations.

In 2008, there were an estimated 800 members. The number decreased to 650 by 2018. In 2019, the Lodge started a charity for underprivileged children.

The Lodge in Singapore is under the charge of the District Grand Lodge of the Eastern Archipelago, a unit of the United Grand Lodge of England.

== Notable members ==
- Thomas Braddell
- Samuel Dunlop
- Henry Keppel
- Stamford Raffles
- William Henry Macleod Read
- William Napier
