= Parartocarpus venenosus =

Conservation status
- Least Concern (IUCN 3.1)

Scientific classification
- Kingdom: Plantae
- Clade: Tracheophytes
- Clade: Angiosperms
- Clade: Eudicots
- Clade: Rosids
- Order: Rosales
- Family: Moraceae
- Genus: Parartocarpus
- Species: P. venenosus

Binomial name
- Parartocarpus venenosus (Zoll. & Moritzi) Becc.

Synonyms
- Synonymy: Artocarpus cerifer Miq.; Artocarpus forbesii King; Artocarpus involucratus K.Schum.; Artocarpus riedelii Miq.; Artocarpus tylophyllus (Miq.) Miq.; Artocarpus venenosus Zoll. & Moritzi; Artocarpus venenosus var. tylophyllus Miq.; Artocarpus woodii Merr.; Gymnartocarpus triandra J.J.Sm.; Gymnartocarpus venenosa (Zoll. & Moritzi) Boerl.; Gymnartocarpus woodii (Merr.) Merr.; Parartocarpus beccarianus Baill.; Parartocarpus borneensis Becc.; Parartocarpus excelsus Becc.; Parartocarpus involucratus (K.Schum.) Warb. ex K.Schum. & Lauterb.; Parartocarpus microcarpus Corner; Parartocarpus papuanus Becc.; Parartocarpus papuanus S.Moore, nom. illeg. homonym. post.; Parartocarpus spinulosus Go; Parartocarpus triandrus (J.J.Sm.) J.J.Sm.; Parartocarpus venenosus subsp. forbesii (King) F.M.Jarrett; Parartocarpus woodii (Merr.) Merr.; Saccus forbesii (King) Kuntze; Saccus tylophyllus (Miq.) Kuntze; Saccus venenosus (Zoll. & Moritzi) Kuntze

Plant species

Parartocarpus venenosus is a tree species in the family Moraceae. It is a native to Malesia, Papuasia, and Peninsular Thailand.

== Names ==
P. venenosus is reconstructed as *lapuka in the Proto-Western Oceanic language, the reconstructed ancestor of the Western Oceanic languages.
