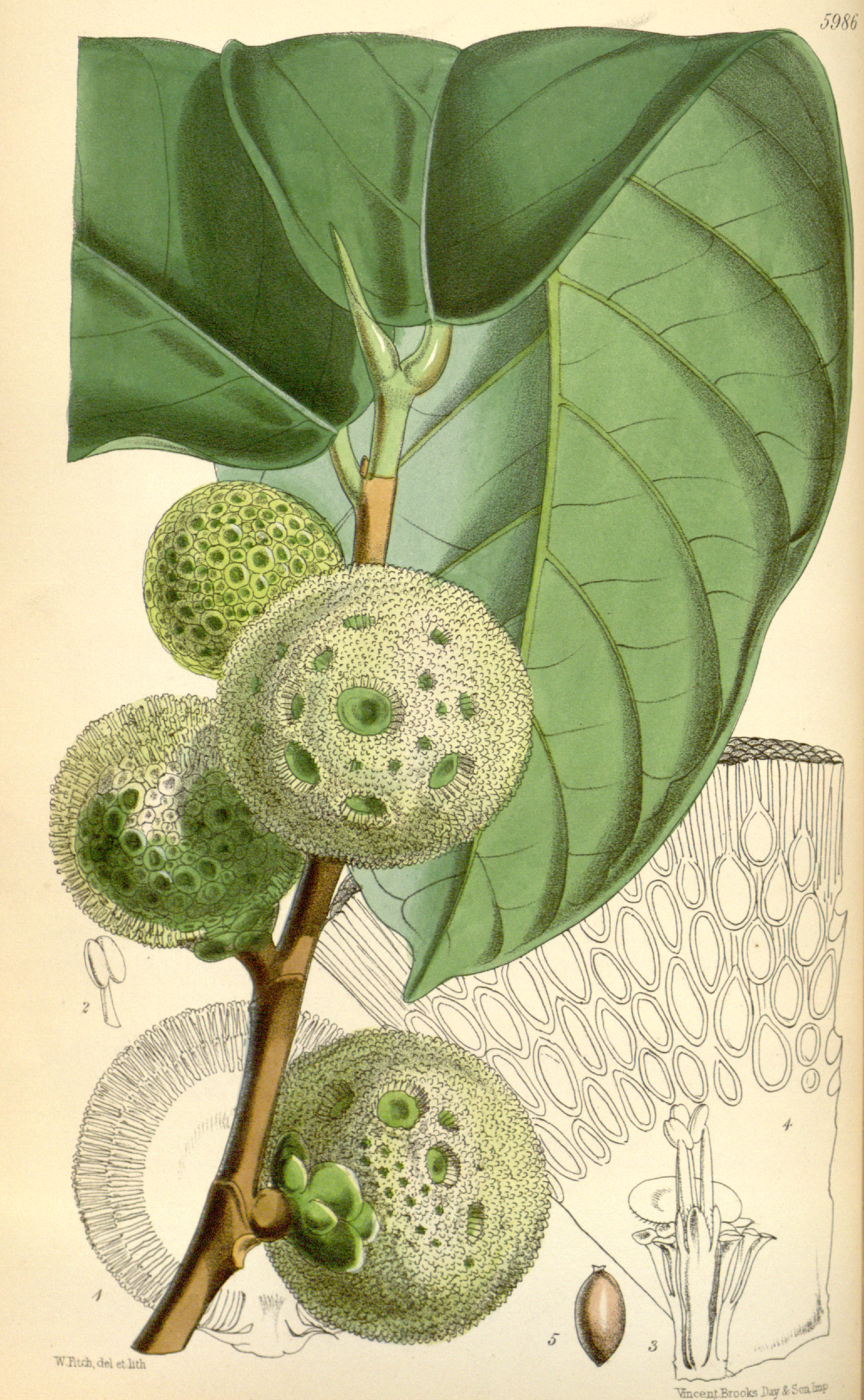

Conservation status
- Least Concern (IUCN 3.1)

Scientific classification
- Kingdom: Plantae
- Clade: Tracheophytes
- Clade: Angiosperms
- Clade: Eudicots
- Clade: Rosids
- Order: Rosales
- Family: Moraceae
- Genus: Treculia
- Species: T. africana

Binomial name
- Treculia africana Decne.

= Treculia africana =

Species of tree

Treculia africana, commonly known as African Breadfruit, is a tree species in the genus Treculia which can be used as a food plant and for various other traditional uses. The fruit are hard and fibrous, can be the size of a volleyball and weight up to 8.5 kg (19 lb). Chimpanzees have been observed to use tools to break the fruit into small pieces that they can eat. Chimpanzees have also been observed sharing slightly alcoholic overripe breadfruit as social bonding. The fruit contain polyphenols.

== Description and origin ==
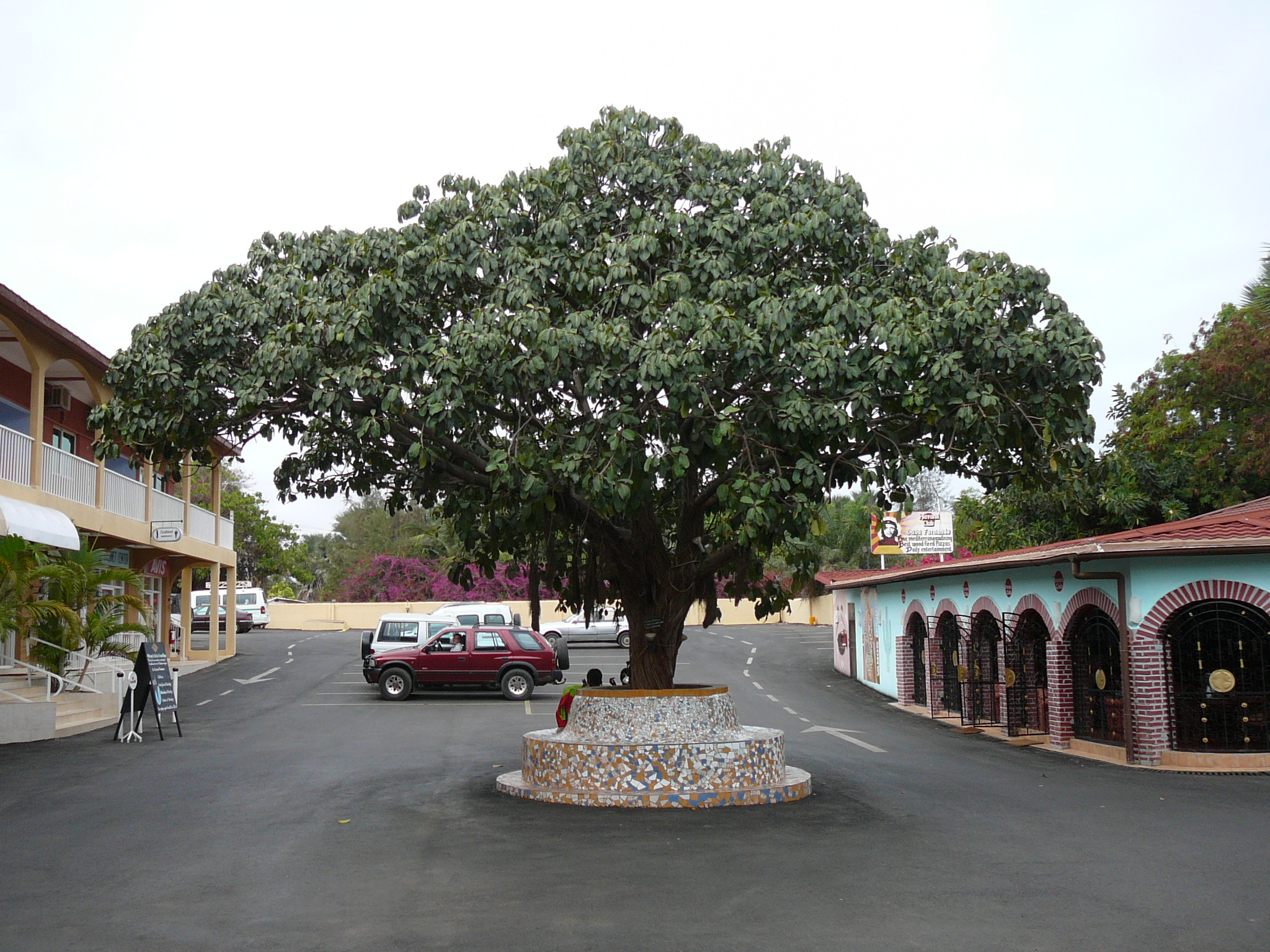
A Treculia africana tree

Treculia africana is a species of tree known in English as African breadfruit (Tanzania, Zambia, Uganda, USA), breadfruit (Nigeria), wild jackfruit (Tanzania, Uganda), and African boxwood (Malawi). Many names are given to this species in the Igbo language in southern Nigeria, but the most common is ukwa; French (arbre á pain d’Afrique); Luganda (muzinda); Swahili (mwaya); Wolof (brebretim).

The geographical distribution of T. africana extends through West and Central Africa. The species can grow below 1,500 metres (4,900 ft) above sea level.

== Botanical characteristics ==
T. africana is a large tree in the family Moraceae. It grows in wet areas and forests. The species can grow up to a height of 30 m (98 ft). The girth of the stem can attain 6 m (20 ft). The bark is grey and discharges a cream latex. The leaves are large and dark green above and lighter below. Trees are dioecious (sexes on separate trees) or sometimes monoecious. Leaves occur in two ranks; stipules are amplexicaul (enclosing the bud). Inflorescences are unisexual, sometimes bisexual, or globose, and borne in the leaf axils or on the older wood and branches. Pistillate (female) flowers line the outer surface of a large receptacle ('bread fruit'). The flowering period is from October until February. The fruit is big, round, and greenish yellow. The texture of the fruit is spongy when it is ripe, and it contains abundant seeds, which are the edible part of this fruit. Depending on the region and environmental conditions, fruit can be harvested year-round. African breadfruit is an enormous fruit that can weigh up to 8.5 kg, and be up to 45 cm (18 in) diameter. These large, seeded fruits can be eaten raw. However, they are typically boiled and roasted to be used in soups, stews and in combination with rice, maize and yams. The seed kernel is consumed more often than the fruit and is used in preparing 'ukwa' porridge, which is considered a delicacy by the Ibo ethnic group of southeast Nigeria. The seeds can also be ground into flour to make bread, pasta, and baby food, or they can be pressed to yield an edible oil. The fruit pulp can be made into a non-alcoholic beverage.

The tree's wood is suitable for pulp and paper making, fuel, charcoal, furniture and carvings. In addition, the fruit, pods, seeds and bran make a nutritious livestock feed and are a popular food for wild monkeys and chimpanzees.

Treculia africana is often used in soil conservation projects because its leaves are a great source of green manure. For this reason, it has been recommended as a promising species for use in home gardens and for intercropping systems in agroforestry. In areas where it grows natively, the fruit and seeds can help alleviate seasonal food scarcity.

Parts of the tree including its leaves and bark are also used in folk medicine. The crushed leaves are sometimes taken orally to treat coughs and thrush in children. Other parts of the plant have been used to treat a range of diseases from rheumatism and gastro-intestinal complaints to high blood pressure. However, these traditional remedies have not yet been scientifically tested and verified.

This species grows in African tropical zones, and it does well in medium (loamy) and heavy (clay) soils. It is usually found near streams or in swampy forest areas at an altitude of up to 1,500 m. Under good environmental conditions, a single tree can produce 30 fruit and yield up to 10 kg of seeds each year.

Seed production from the African breadfruit is considerable, a mature tree producing up to 30 fruit annually, each fruit yielding 5–10 kg of seed after processing. For processing, the fruit are stacked in a heap and allowed to ferment. The fermented mass is macerated and washed in running water until all adhering slimy, jelly-like substances have been removed. Cleaned seeds are subsequently air-dried, dehulled and available for sale in local markets. Cooked seeds make very delicious meals.

It has also been recommended as a promising species for intercropping agroforestry systems, but so far remains underutilized.

The seeds (used to make flour and porridge) are especially rich in vitamins including vitamin B1, B2, B3 and A. They also contain high amounts of zinc, iron, phosphorus and magnesium. In fact, 100 g of raw seeds, have almost twice as much potassium as the same serving of bananas. In addition, the seeds contain more protein than soybeans.

Seeds are dicotyledonous.

Found throughout Africa in countries such as Nigeria, Angola, Zambia, Cameroon, Central African Republic, Côte d'Ivoire and Senegal.

== Varieties ==
Based on detailed field observations, three varieties are distinguished within the subspecies: T. a. var. africana (extending from Senegal to Southern Sudan and south to Angola, central Mozambique and São Tomé and Príncipe islands), T. a. var. inversa (Anambra State, Edo and Delta States, more abundant in the eastern states of Nigeria), and T. a. var. mollis (isolated localities in Edo and Delta states of Nigeria, Cameroon, Congo, Gabon, and Cabinda).

Their taxonomic differences are based mainly on the size of the fruit head (infructence) and the hairiness of branchlets and leaves. A striking variation exists in the number of fruit heads produced by trees belonging to T. a. var. africana (with large fruit heads) and T. a. var. inversa (with small fruit heads). The former is clearly superior in the weight of seeds produced, while the latter produces more fruit and also produces twice as many branches.

Key to the varieties of T. africana

1. Branchlets, petioles and undersurface of leaves soon glabrous, shining and glossy; leaves ovate-elliptic:
• Fruit head large, over 20 cm in diam.(Very large, being usually over 60 cm in longitudinal circumference), often smooth; seeds also large, rounded, sometimes elongated, about 1.3 cm long; mesocarp over 5 cm thick; slash pinkish (var. africana)
• Fruit heads small, usually less than 20 cm in diam., often knobbly or wrinkled; seeds small, elongated, sometimes more or less rounded, about 1 cm long or less; mesocarp less than 5 cm thick; slash brownish (var. inversa)
2. Branchlets, petioles and undersurface of leaves with persistent spreading hairs, dull, not glossy; leaves oblong-elliptic;
•Fruit heads small, usually less than 20 cm in diam., often knobbly or wrinkled; seeds, small, rounded to elongated, about 1 cm long; mesocarp less than 5 cm thick; slash pinkish (var. mollis)

- Treculia africana

•Treculia africana subsp. africana Decne. ex Trec.
•Treculia africana subsp. madagascarica (N.E. Br.) C.C. Berg
•Treculia africana var. ilicifolia (Leandri) C.C. Berg
•Treculia africana var. inversa J.C. Okafor
•Treculia africana var. mollis (Engl.) Léonard
•Treculia africana var. sambiranensis (Leandri) C.C. Berg

== Uses ==
=== Culinary use ===
African breadfruit is an edible traditional fruit, consumed, for example in Nigeria, where it is eaten as a main dish. The seeds are of particular interest because of their high nutritional value. Fresh seeds contain 38.3% carbohydrate, 17.7% crude protein, and 15.9% fat. Readily available in many developing African countries, T. africana can be an alternative to rice and yam. The seeds can be ground to flour, pressed for oil, or used as flavouring in alcoholic drinks. They can also be dry-roasted and eaten as a snack.

African breadfruit is a good adjunct in brewing because it is a source of fermentable sugars.

=== Wood products ===
The wood has many uses such as firewood, for furniture, and for home and other building construction. It can also be processed into paper.

=== Animal feed ===
In countries such as Malawi and Tanzania, the fruit-head pulp and bran are used to feed monkeys and farm animals.

=== Environmental functions ===
This tree helps to control erosion and is a good natural source of mulch. However, deforestation, higher demand for cultivated agricultural areas, and the increasing population reduce numbers of this important forest tree in the African tropics.

The traditional farming system uses mixed cropping. For example, the complete burning of land has an erosion effect which can be minimized if these trees are present.

=== Afforestation and reforestation. ===
T. africana is used for reforestation projects in Africa. The Nutrecul Agroforestry Project, an authority in Treculia nursery, is taking the lead and has the most genetic variation of trees. The organization has the largest collection of in vitro tissue culture mother plants and also has its own cultivariety

•Treculia africana subsp. africana cultivar. Nutreculia Nutrecul-TRC
