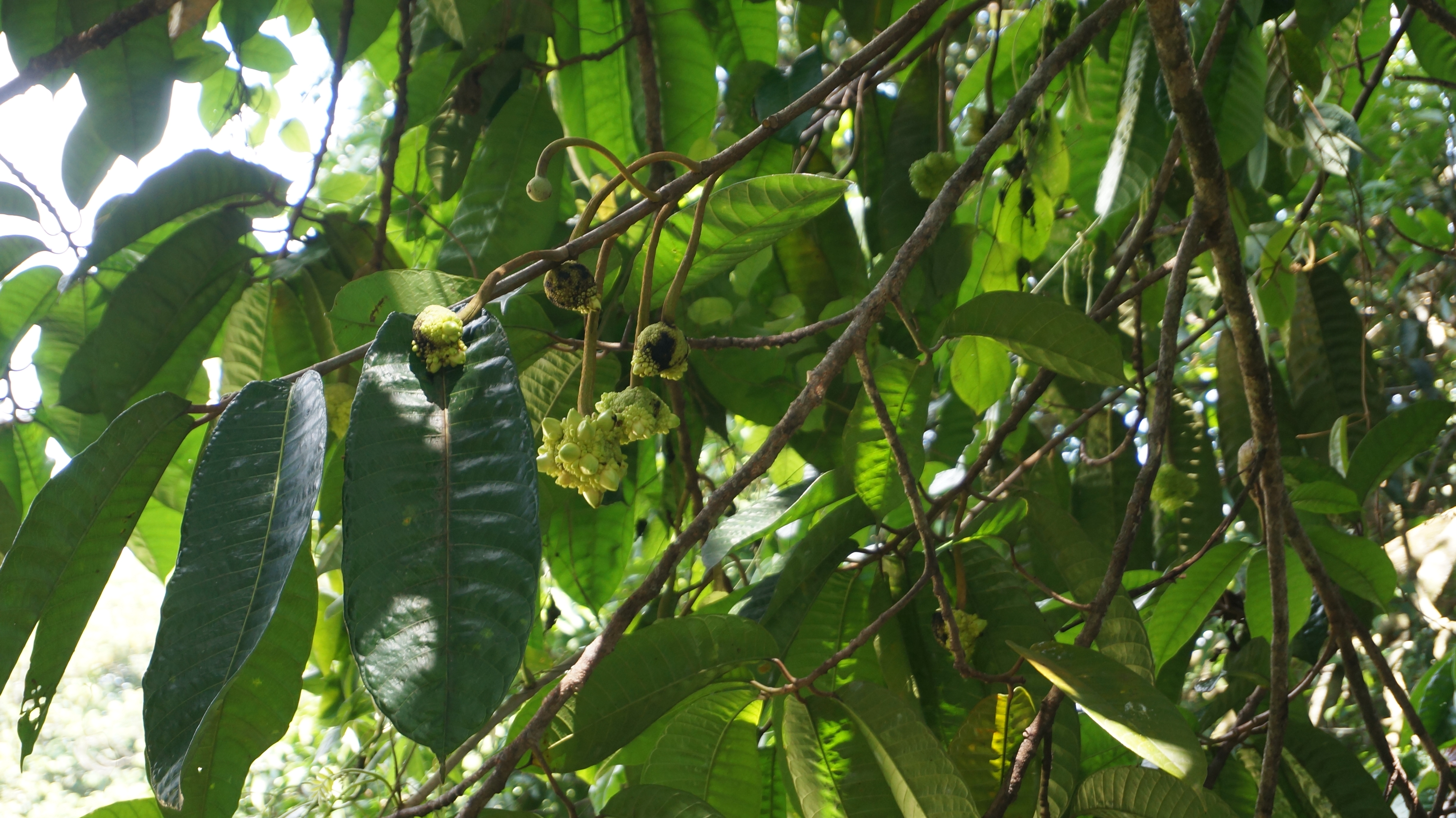

Conservation status
- Least Concern (IUCN 3.1)

Scientific classification
- Kingdom: Plantae
- Clade: Tracheophytes
- Clade: Angiosperms
- Clade: Eudicots
- Clade: Rosids
- Order: Rosales
- Family: Moraceae
- Genus: Prainea
- Species: P. limpato

Binomial name
- Prainea limpato (Miq.) Beumee ex K.Heyne

Synonyms
- Artocarpus limpato Miq.

= Prainea limpato =

Species of flowering plant

Prainea limpato, also known as tampang susu in Malay and more locally as kesusu or empatak, is a species of flowering plant, a fruit tree in the fig family, that is native to Southeast Asia.

== Description ==
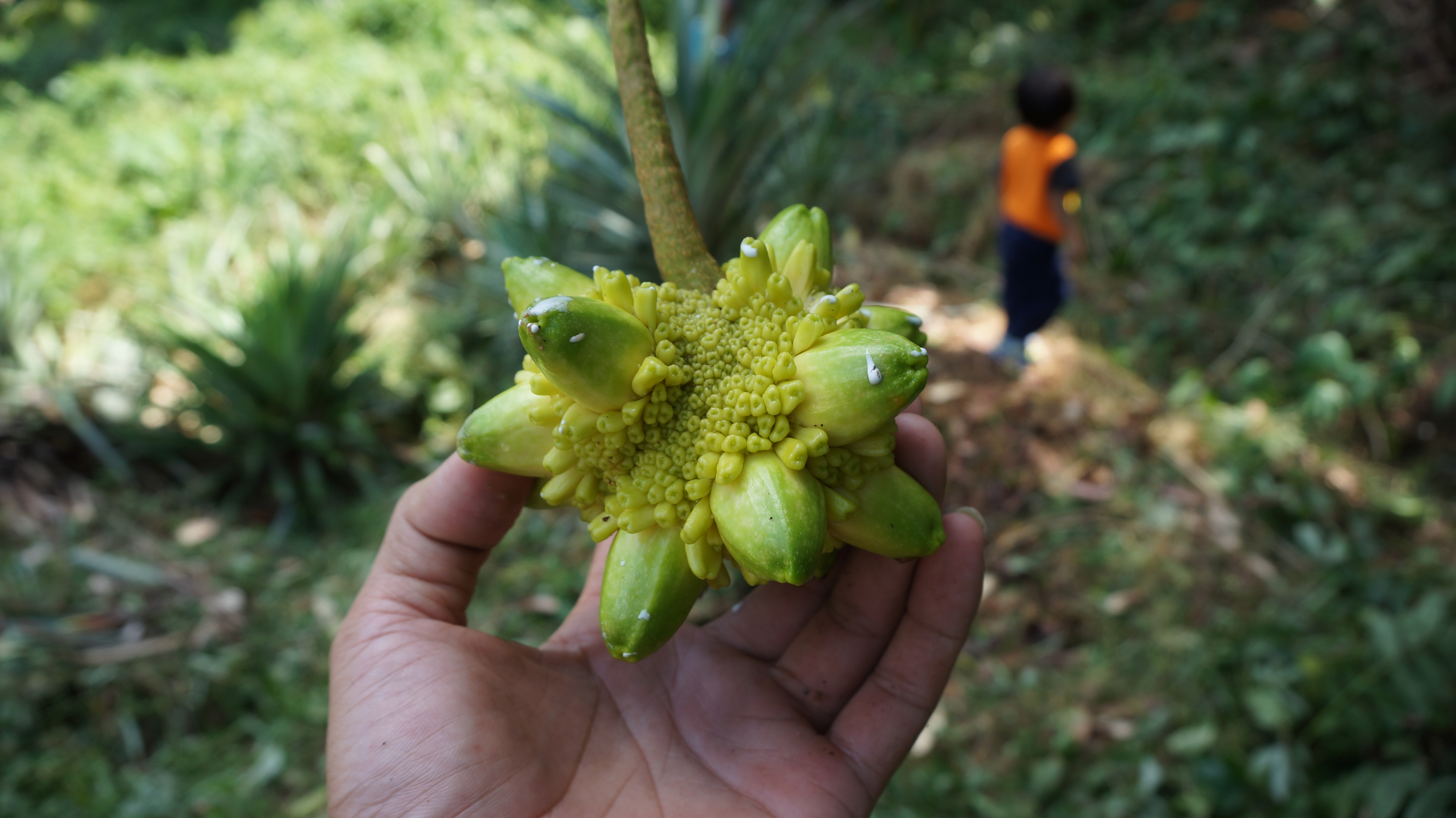
Fruit

The tree grows to 30 m in height, with a bole of 2–4 m, with white latex. The leaves are 10–35 cm long by 4–15 cm wide. The globular inflorescences occur in the leaf axils. The syncarpous infructescences comprise 8–20 oval fruits, each 1.5–2 cm by 1 cm in diameter, projecting outwards from the core and ripening orange. The fruits are edible, with the orange aril tasting of bananas.

== Distribution and habitat ==
The species is found in the Malay Peninsula, Sumatra and Borneo, where it occurs naturally in lowland and hill mixed dipterocarp forest, as well as on limestone soils and along riverbanks, up to an elevation of 700 m. It is also planted in rural villages.
