= Auguste Trécul =

French botanist (1818–1896)

Auguste Adolphe Lucien Trécul (8 January 1818 in Mondoubleau – 17 October 1896 in Paris) was a French botanist.

He studied pharmacy in Paris, and in 1841 became an interne to hospitals. His interests later changed to botany, and in 1848–50, on behalf of the Muséum national d'histoire naturelle and the Ministry of Agriculture, he conducted scientific research in North America. In 1866 he became a member of the Academy of Sciences (botany section), and during the following year, was awarded the Légion d'Honneur.

His main research dealt with plant anatomy, physiology and organogenesis. He published important papers on the structure of different members within the botanical family Nymphaeaceae, and was the author of a significant monograph on Artocarpeae. Many of his scientific articles were published in the Annales des Sciences Naturelles (from 1843 onward) and the Comptes rendus de l'Académie des sciences. In his studies of fermentation, he differed with the conclusions reached by Louis Pasteur. The plant genus Treculia (family Moraceae) was named in his honor by Joseph Decaisne. and Trécul was elected to honorary membership of the Manchester Literary and Philosophical Society 1872.

== Selected works ==
- Mémoire sur la famille des Artocarpées, 1847 – Memoir on the plant family Artocarpeae.
- Mémoire sur la formation des feuilles, 1853 – Memoir on the formation of leaves.
- Études anatomiques et organogeniques sur la Victoria Regia et anatomie comparée du Nelumbium, du Nuphar et de la Victoria, 1854 – Anatomical and organogenic studies of Victoria regia and the comparative anatomy of Nelumbo, Nuphar and Victoria.
- De l'Influence des décortications annulaires sur la végétation des arbres dicotylédonés, 1855 – Influence of annular decortications on the vegetation of broadleaf trees.
- Notice des principaux mémoires publiés de 1843 à 1860... – Principal published works from 1843 to 1860.
