= Prainea =

Scientific classification
- Kingdom: Plantae
- Clade: Tracheophytes
- Clade: Angiosperms
- Clade: Eudicots
- Clade: Rosids
- Order: Rosales
- Family: Moraceae
- Tribe: Artocarpeae
- Genus: Prainea; King ex Hook.f. (1888)

Type species
- Prainea scandens King ex Hook.f.

Genus of trees

Prainea is a genus of trees in the plant family Moraceae. It is sometimes treated as a subgenus of Artocarpus. In fact, in Plants of the World Online, two species, native to Peninsular Thailand, Peninsular Malaysia, Sumatra, Borneo, the Maluku Islands, New Guinea and the Solomon Islands, that were classified in genus Praineain Plants of the World Online are transferred to Artocarpus. They are classified in subgenus Prainea (King) Zerega which is distinct from other Artocarpus subgenera mainly due to its dioecious nature.

== Species ==
Two species were accepted.

- Artocarpus limpato Miq. [syn. Prainea limpato (Miq.) Beumée ex K.Heyne] – Sumatra, Borneo, Peninsular Malaysia, Maluku Islands, New Guinea and Solomon Islands
- Artocarpus scandens (King) Renner [syn. Prainea scandens King]] – Peninsular Thailand, Peninsular Malaysia and Borneo
