= C. E. S. Phillips =

British physicist and radiologist

Major Charles Edmund Stanley Phillips OBE FIP FRSE (18 February 1871 – 17 October 1945) was a 20th-century British physicist and radiologist. He was also a gifted amateur artist.

One of the founders of the Institute of Physics in 1920, the Phillips Award is named in his honour.

== Life ==
He was born in London on 18 February 1871 the son of Samuel E. Phillips, founder of the submarine cable company, Johnson and Phillips.

He studied at the Central Technical College in South Kensington. In 1895, at the invention of x-rays he became hugely interested in this field. He created his own laboratory at Shooters Hill in south-east London.

In 1906 he was elected a Fellow of the Royal Society of Edinburgh. His proposers were William Thomson, Lord Kelvin, Alexander Scott, Sir James Dewar and William Hodgkinson. He was President of the British Institute of Radiology 1930/31.

In the First World War he was commissioned in the West Kent Regiment rising to the rank of Major.

He died at Lymington in Hampshire on 17 October 1945.

== Known artworks ==
- Portrait of William Henry Bragg who was a personal friend.
- The Old Mill at Winchelsea

He also experimented with abstract art.

== Publications ==
- Bibliography of X-Ray Literature and Research 1896-97
