= Daprainia =

Scientific classification
- Kingdom: Plantae
- Clade: Tracheophytes
- Clade: Angiosperms
- Clade: Eudicots
- Clade: Rosids
- Order: Fabales
- Family: Fabaceae
- Subfamily: Faboideae
- Genus: Daprainia; H.Ohashi & K.Ohashi (2019)
- Species: D. kingiana

Binomial name
- Daprainia kingiana (Prain) H.Ohashi & K.Ohashi (2019)

Synonyms
- Desmodium kingianum Prain (1897); Desmodium pseudarthrioides Schindl. (1916); Ototropis kingiana (Prain) H.Ohashi & K.Ohashi (2012)

Genus of legumes

Daprainia kingiana is a species of flowering plant in the legume family, Fabaceae. It is a shrub native to Myanmar, Laos, Thailand, and Cambodia. It is the sole species in genus Daprainia.
