= Hullettia =

Scientific classification
- Kingdom: Plantae
- Clade: Tracheophytes
- Clade: Angiosperms
- Clade: Eudicots
- Clade: Rosids
- Order: Rosales
- Family: Moraceae
- Genus: Hullettia; King ex Hook.f. (1888)

Genus of plants

Hullettia is a genus of flowering plants belonging to the family Moraceae.

It is native to Myanmar, Malaya, Thailand and Sumatera.

The genus name of Hullettia is in honour of Richmond William Hullett (1843–1914), an English 19th century headmaster, explorer and plant collector, and it was first described and published in Fl. Brit. India Vol.5 on page 547 in 1888.

Known species, according to Kew:

- Hullettia dumosa King ex Hook.f.
- Hullettia griffithiana (Kurz) Hook.f.
