= Raffles Institution =

Coordinates: 1.347598°N 103.843951°E

Location
- 1 Raffles Institution Lane; Singapore 575954; Singapore

Information
- Type: Independent
- Motto: Auspicium Melioris Aevi (Latin) (Hope of a Better Age (Note: While the school's translation of its motto is "hope of a better age", this is a mistranslation. Auspicium primarily means an augury or auspice, which is a divinatory omen derived by an augur from watching the flight of birds. It may mean omen, token or sign, but not hope.))
- Founded: 5 June 1823; 203 years ago
- Founder: Stamford Raffles
- Sister school: Raffles Girls' School
- Chairman: Bey So Khiam
- Principal: Aaron Loh
- Gender: Boys (Year 1-4); Mixed (Year 5-6)
- Enrolment: 4,000
- Colours: Green; Black; White
- Mascot: Gryphon and eagle
- Team name: Team Raffles
- Publication: The Rafflesian Times
- Yearbook: The Rafflesian
- Website: ri.edu.sg

Raffles Institution (RI) is an independent educational institution in Singapore. Founded in 1823, it is one of the oldest schools in the country. It provides secondary education for boys only from Year 1 to Year 4, and pre-university education for both boys and girls in Year 5 and Year 6. Since 2007, RI and its affiliated school Raffles Girls' School have been offering the six-year Raffles Programme, which allows students to skip the Singapore-Cambridge GCE O-Level examinations and proceed to take the Singapore-Cambridge GCE A-Level examinations at the end of Year 6.

RI is notable for having produced 96 President's Scholars, three presidents, four prime ministers and chief ministers, four deputy prime ministers, four speakers of Parliament, many Cabinet ministers and Members of Parliament, as well as many chief executive officers of statutory boards, agencies and state-owned companies. Its alumni includes former Prime Ministers Lee Kuan Yew and Goh Chok Tong, former Chief Ministers David Marshall and Lim Yew Hock as well as former Presidents Yusof Ishak, Benjamin Sheares and Wee Kim Wee. Robert Kuok, Southeast Asia's wealthiest man at the turn of the 21st century, is also an alumnus.

RI has one of the highest admission rates to top universities such as the Ivy League and Oxbridge. It had the highest number of admissions to the University of Cambridge in the world, with 48 students receiving offers in the 2022 admissions cycle, while 52 were accepted for Oxford and Cambridge combined in 2021, and 77 in 2022 (2nd highest of all schools globally).

RI is a member of various academic partnerships and alliances, such as the G30 Schools and Winchester Network. It also co-founded the Global Alliance of Leading-Edge Schools.

== History ==
An undated photo of the original Raffles Institution building at the junction of Bras Basah and Beach Road (the site diagonally opposite SAF Warrant Officers and Specialists Club building)

=== Foundation ===
RI was founded by Stamford Raffles, who proposed the establishment of "the Institution" or "Singapore Institution" at a meeting he convened on 1 April 1823. Raffles wanted to establish a college for the people of Singapore since the founding of the colony, and wrote on 12 January 1823 that a site for a planned college had been selected. His intention was to provide education for the children of Malay Ruler and leaders in the new British colony of Singapore as well as the company's employees and others who wished to learn the local languages. Another objective was to "collect the scattered literature and traditions of the country" so that the most important may be published and circulated. Raffles referred to the plan as his "last public act"; by setting up the Institution, he hoped it that it could, through its generations of alumni, serve as "the means of civilising and bettering the conditions of millions" beyond Singapore. Those involved in the plan for the Institution included Reverend Robert Morrison, Sophia Raffles, William Farquhar, William Marsden and Robert Sparke Hutchings. It was initially suggested that the Institution should merge with the Anglo-Chinese College founded by Morrison in Malacca, but this plan did not . Raffles contributed S$2,000, secured a grant of S$4,000 from the British East India Company and, together with subscriptions from other individuals, raised funds totalling S$17,495 for the project. He drafted the curriculum, and set up the structure for the board of trustees that included William Wilberforce.

The original building of RI was sited on Bras Basah Road and it was designed by engineer Philip Jackson. Raffles laid the foundation stone of the building on 5 June 1823, a few days before he left Singapore for the last time on 9 June. No classes were held while the building was under construction, but the project stalled and the building was left unfinished for some time. Raffles' vision was also not shared by John Crawfurd, the British Resident of Singapore, who felt the scale of the project excessive, and that the government should focus its efforts on elementary education instead. In 1835, a group of European merchants raised money for the Raffles Monument Fund to commemorate Raffles' contribution to Singapore, and proposed that it should be used to complete the Institution. George Drumgoole Coleman was then hired to finish and extend the original building by Jackson.

==== Early years ====
On 1 August 1834, Reverend F. J. Darrah opened the Singapore Free School with 46 boys, which quickly grew to nearly 80. When the building for the Institution was completed in 1837, the school applied to occupy the building, a proposal the trustees of the Institution accepted. The Singapore Free School moved into the building in December 1837, and became the Institution Free School. It was, however, established as an elementary school rather than the college that Raffles had initially intended. Originally the school offered classes in Malay, Chinese and English, but the Malay classes soon closed in 1842 due to low enrolment, and it would eventually become an English-medium school. In May 1839, the first wing extension was completed, and the second at the end of 1841. By 1846, it was commonly referred to as "Raffles School".

In 1856, the Singapore Institution Free School was renamed Singapore Institution.

In the 1860s, the school gradually turned into a high school. In 1868, the school was renamed Raffles Institution in honour of its founder. The most significant headmasters of the period were J. B. Bayley and R. W. Hullett, who oversaw the transition and ran the school for a cumulative period of 50 years. The names "Raffles Institution" and "Raffles School" continued to be used interchangeably. In fact, the term "Raffles Institution" had been used as early as 1836.

The school is Singapore's first institution to enrol girls, with 11 pupils accepted in 1844. In 1879, the girls' wing of the school was established as a separate but affiliated school, Raffles Girls' School.

The Old Rafflesian's Association (ORA), the official alumni network of the Institution, was formed in 1923 on the centennial of the Institution's founding. With Song Ong Siang and Seah Seng Kang as its inaugural President and Secretary respectively, the ORA serves to promote stronger networks and relationships between alumni of Raffles Institution, Raffles Girls' School and Raffles Junior College.

=== Relocation ===
In March 1972, the school moved to Grange Road. The old building was demolished and replaced by Raffles City Shopping Centre. The Bras Basah campus's library building is featured on the S$2 paper and polymer note in Singapore currency.

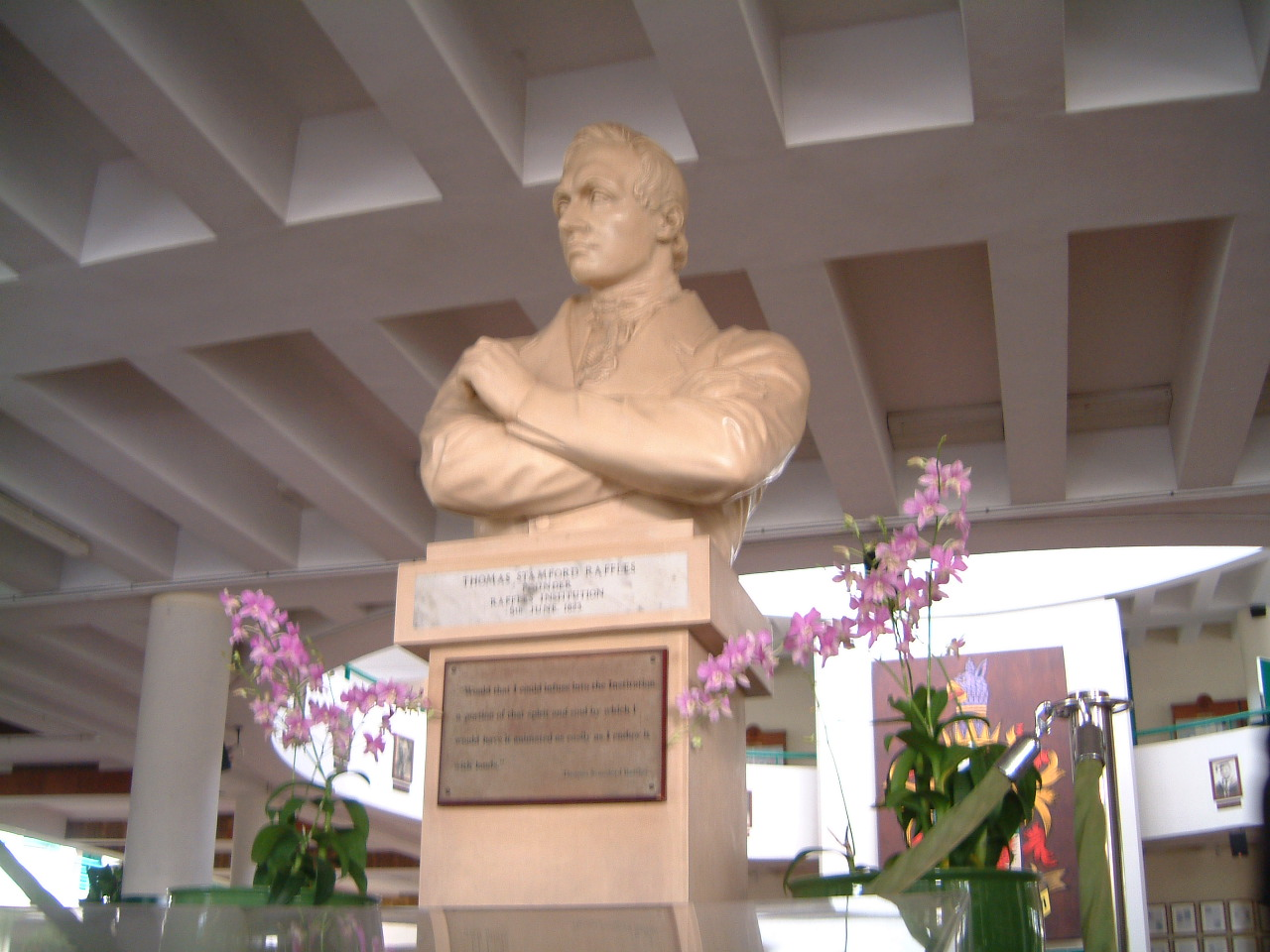
Bust of Stamford Raffles at the Year 1-4 atrium

In 1984, RI became one of two schools selected by the Ministry of Education to pilot the Gifted Education Programme to cater to intellectually gifted students.

In 1990, the school moved again, this time from Grange Road to a new campus at Bishan, then a recently created new town. In the same year, RI became an independent school, and was the first government school to attain the status.

=== Raffles Junior College ===
In 1982, Raffles Junior College (RJC) was established at Paterson Road to take over the school's burgeoning pre-university enrolment. It subsequently moved to Mount Sinai Road in 1984.

In 2004, the six-year Raffles Programme was offered to Secondary 1 to 3 students. It allows RI students to skip the Singapore-Cambridge GCE Ordinary Level examinations, which students would previously sit for at the end of Year 4. Instead, they move on directly to RJC for Years 5 and 6 and sit for the Singapore-Cambridge GCE Advanced Level examinations at the end of Year 6. This frees up time which students would otherwise spend on preparing for the O Level examinations, allowing them to spend more time engaging in enrichment and co-curricular or passion-driven activities. The curriculum serves to "seek to nurture the best and brightest into men and women of scholarship who will be leaders of distinction, committed to excellence and service in the interest of the community and nation." This subsequently led to the merging of RI's GEP and Special/Express streams to form a single Raffles Programme stream, and the establishment of its in-house academic talent development programme, Raffles Academy, catering to exceptionally gifted students via subject-specific pullout classes from Year 3 onwards, in 2007.

In 2005, RJC, along with Hwa Chong Junior College, became one of the first junior colleges in Singapore to attain independent status. RJC moved to its new Bishan campus adjacent to RI at the start of the 2005 school year, after attaining independent status and becoming the first pre-university institution in Singapore to be awarded the School Excellence Award.

=== Reintegration as Raffles Institution ===
In 2009, RI and RJC re-integrated to form a single institution under the name "Raffles Institution (RI)" to facilitate the running of the Raffles Programme and better align processes and curriculum.

On 23 May 2023, RI commemorated its bicentenary during Founder's Day. Former Education Minister Chan Chun Sing delivered then Prime Minister Lee Hsien Loong's speech, mentioning:

RI must continue to exemplify Singapore's inclusive spirit and egalitarian ethos to be a beacon of hope and opportunity for every student regardless of their backgrounds.

== School identity and culture ==
=== Houses ===
The five houses, three of them named after former headmasters, are Bayley, Buckley, Hullett, Moor and Morrison, represented by the colours yellow, green, black, red and blue respectively.

● C. B. Buckley was the Secretary to the Board of Trustees of Raffles Institution.

● J. B. Bayley was a Headmaster who "raised Raffles Institution to a large and flourishing establishment", as recorded by the board of trustees.

● J. H. Moor was the first Headmaster of the school, whose 4th great-grandson is Justin Trudeau, former Prime Minister of Canada.

● Reverend Robert Morrison was the co-founder of Raffles Institution.

● R.W. Hullett was Raffles Institution's longest-serving Headmaster (31 years).

Year 1 students are sorted into houses by class. In the early years of RI's history, there were ten houses, including a sixth Philips house (purple), later disbanded. House allocations used to be student-based, instead of class-based. Each House is led by a House Captain, a Year 4 student, who carries out his role along with the respective House Committee. The Houses participate in inter-house tournaments and activities, notably including the annual Inter-House Sports Carnival, Dramafeste and the Inter-House Debate tournament, with points earned from each activity contributing to the House Championship which is awarded at the end of the school year.

Students of the college section were divided into five Houses, the name of which is an amalgamation of its counterparts in RI and RGS:

Buckle-Buckley
Bayley-Waddle
Hadley-Hullett
Moor-Tarbet
Morrison-Richardson

=== Uniform ===
The school uniform from Years 1 to 4 is all-white, including a white short-sleeved shirt with the school badge at the top-right corner of the shirt pocket. Lower secondary students (Years 1 and 2) wear white short trousers and white socks. From Year 3 onwards, students may continue in short pants or opt for white long trousers. Shoes are white-based for all students. All prefects wear a different badge and formal black shoes, except for Physical Education lessons, where they wear appropriate shoes. School ties are worn on formal occasions. Teachers wear a formal gown for special occasions. The uniform for male students in Years 5 and 6 is identical to that worn by students in Years 3 and 4. The uniform for female students in Years 5 and 6 consists of a white blouse and a dark green pleated skirt.

=== Discipline ===
In his memoir The Singapore Story, Lee Kuan Yew mentioned that he was caned by the headmaster D. W. McLeod for chronic tardiness when he attended RI in the 1930s. In 1956, a former RI prefect also wrote that during his time there, "boys were caned on their bottoms for even winking at the girls. We did have very good discipline in our time and the boys became good citizens, lawyers, doctors, etc."

== Subject System ==
=== New Subject Combination ===
The new subject combination system was introduced in 2025. The new changes are as follows:

For a student to offer 8 subjects in Year 3, he must at least obtain a C in 5 examinable subjects including English Language and Mathematics or Science.

For a student to offer 9 subjects in Year 3, he must at least obtain a C in 6 examinable subjects including English Language and at least a B in Mathematics or Science.

For a student to offer 10 subjects (inclusive of an elective programme) in Year 3, he must at least obtain a B in 6 examinable subjects including English Language, and Mathematics or Science and at least a C in the Elective subject.

=== Grading System ===
The grading system is as follows:

RP Grading System
Marks	RP Grade
70 & above	A
60 – 69	B
50 – 59	C
45 – 49	D
44 & below	U

== Curriculum and student activities ==
Since 2007, the school has offered the six-year Integrated Programme, which allows students to bypass the Singapore-Cambridge GCE Ordinary Level examinations and take the Singapore-Cambridge GCE Advanced Level examinations at the end of Year 6. Known within the Raffles schools as the Raffles Programme, it is offered jointly with Raffles Girls' School.

=== Orientation programmes ===
==== Year 1 Orientation Camp ====
The new intake of Year 1 students go through a 3-day orientation camp, involving understanding the school's culture and knowing the campus grounds, and various activities to facilitate class bonding, leadership development, etc. Year 4 Peer Support Leaders and the Head and Deputy head prefects guide them through this camp and the rest of the orientation period. At the end of the camp, the first-year students receive their school badges in the Junior Rafflesian Investiture Ceremony (JRIC), which occurs on the Friday of the Orientation Week.

=== Raffles Leadership Programme ===
The Raffles Leadership Programme is an initiative of the Leadership Development Department, aimed at preparing students to take on positions of leadership in school and in life. All Year 3 pupils go through the programme which includes going through the Leadership Challenge Workshop and taking the Myers-Briggs Type Indicator Instrument. It also features a one-term residential component at RI Boarding. The boarding programme started as a trial in 2008 and has now become a full-cohort programme.

Under the Raffles Leadership Programme, Year 3 pupils also get to take part in a ten-week residential programme in RI Boarding to learn about independent living skills. The boarding programme was shortened to a seven-week programme in 2019.

=== Raffles Institution Prefectorial Board (Year 1-4) ===
The Prefectorial Board in Years 1-4 is divided into 3 branches, namely the Spirits Branch, the Outreach Branch, and the Culture Branch. Each branch is divided further into two departments with

Spirits: Raffles Rapport (RARA) and CCAs and Houses (CCAH)

Outreach: Communications (Comms) and Social and Relations (SnR)

Culture: Community Development (ComDev) and Student Standards (SS)

The prefects go through a 2-day, 1 night Prefects' Camp, spearheaded by the newly elected Executive Committee, where newly elected prefects bond over activities such as dragon boating, escape room etc. They are then invested into the board during the Promethean Leadership Investiture.

The Executive Committee is led by a Head Prefect, Deputy Head Prefect, Spirits Branch Head, Outreach Branch Head, Culture Branch Head. As of August 2026, the Prefectorial Board has been updated to further include a Secretary-General, who will do the following:

1. Drive coherence across PB by aligning departmental initiatives with Board priorities.

2. Support HP and DHP in planning and reviewing the Board's key initiatives.

3. Surface overlaps, gaps and opportunities for collaboration across departments.

4. Steward Board's institutional memory by consolidating learning, strengthening internal SOPs and guiding handover to future batches.

5. Lead Board-level reflection on the leadership journey at mid-year and year-end.

=== Students' Council (Year 5-6) ===
The Students' Council of the Years 5-6 section is divided into a total of eight departments, namely the Welfare Department, the Communications Department, the CCA Department and five House Directorates, which form the EXCO for each of the five houses. Each councillor also takes up one or two of the six functions, which are college events organised by the council: National Day, Teachers' Day, Grad Night, Open House, Orientation and Council Camp. Members of the Students' Council are selected through a college-wide election process. Each batch undergoes a rigorous selection process, which culminates in the Council Investiture. The Students' Council is headed by a President, who is assisted by his/her executive committee consisting of two vice-presidents, two Secretaries, the three Heads of Departments and the five House Captains. As of February 2026, the school is served by the 45th batch of Student Councillors.

=== Co-curricular activities ===
==== Year 1-4 (Secondary School section) ====
RI offers about 40 co-curricular activities (CCAs), including sports, uniformed groups, performing arts, and clubs and societies.

CCAs are categorised as either core or merit CCAs. Core CCAs comprise all sports, uniformed groups and performing arts, as well as Raffles Debaters while merit CCAs consist of all other clubs and societies. Every student of the school takes up at least one core CCA. Merit CCAs are optional, but students are encouraged to take up at least one merit CCA to supplement their core CCA. Certain merit CCAs, such as the Infocomm Club, however, may substitute for a core CCA instead.

The school's sports teams and uniformed groups have earned top places in many national inter-school competitions, doing well in Red Cross Youth, rugby, National Cadet Corps, sailing, hockey, floorball, Boys' Brigade, and cross-country running, among others.

The performing arts groups have also done well in the Singapore Youth Festival, held once every two years, while the clubs and societies have also won awards.

==== Year 5-6 (Junior College Section) ====
The Year 5-6 section offers over 70 CCAs, including sports, performing arts, and clubs and societies. Unlike in the first four years of the Raffles Programme, no distinction is made between core and merit CCAs. Students may offer up to two CCAs, no more than one of which may be a sports or performing arts group.

Teams from RI performed well nationally in 2011, with the performing arts groups clinching 15 Golds (including nine with honours) and five Silvers at the biennial Singapore Youth Festival Central Judging and the sports teams winning 32 championship titles as well as 24 Silvers and 11 Bronzes at the National Interschools Sports Championships. The school's clubs and societies have also performed excellently in their various national competitions, with Raffles Debaters clinching championship titles and the History and Strategic Affairs Society clinching best school delegation awards at international Model United Nations conferences.

=== Publications ===
The college community is served by Raffles Press, the school's journalism society, which publishes its flagship online student newspaper Word of Mouth. The newspaper includes features, op-ed columns, sports reports and concert reviews. In addition, all staff and most students also receive a copy of the Rafflesian Times, the school's official magazine, from the Communications Department.

The journalism society regularly publishes articles dealing with daily school life, recent assemblies and events as well as wider national issues including Singapore's golden jubilee (SG50) and the 2015 Southeast Asian haze.

In 2015, students from the school also started an unofficial satirical publication, The Waffle Press, which pokes fun at school events and examinations.

== Boarding ==
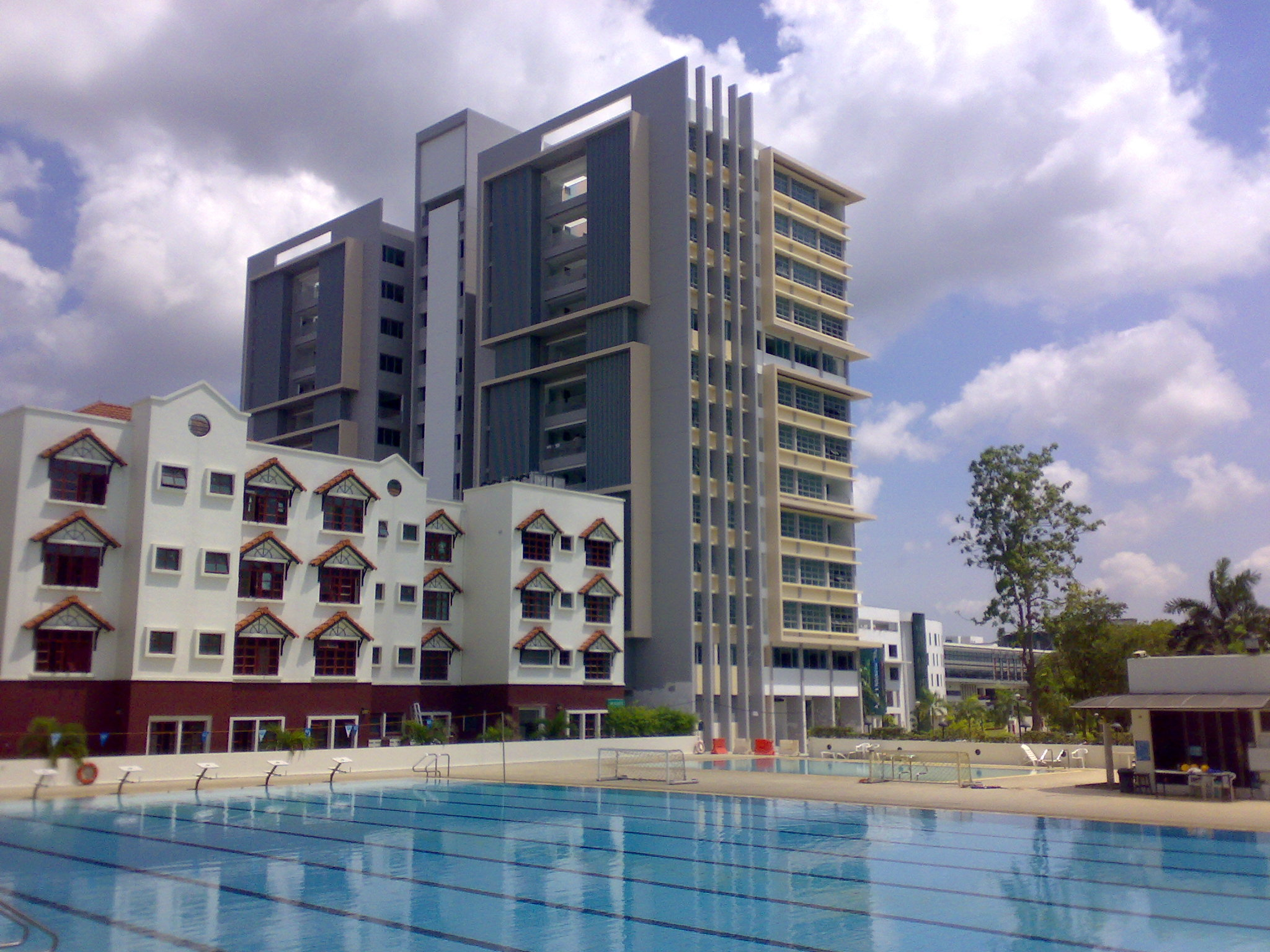
The 13-storey twin towers next to the boarding complex

Raffles Institution Boarding is housed in a boarding complex consisting of five blocks. These are named after the five Houses; Bayley, Buckley, Hullett, Moor and Morrison. Each block, apart from the new Hullett block, can accommodate 90 pupils. All blocks have their own staff, and the boarding complex is overseen by several Boarding Mentors.

=== History ===
The foundation stone of the Boarding Complex was laid by Lee Kuan Yew on 25 March 1994. The first batch of boarders moved into the Complex in 1996. During the upgrading works in 2006, the former Moor block was demolished to make way for a 13-storey twin tower hostel, the Hullett block, completed in July 2007, and the former Hullett block in turn renamed Moor. The three blocks of Buckley, Moor and Bayley houses boys enrolling in Raffles Leadership Programme, whereas Morrison block catered to girls previously.

== Campus ==
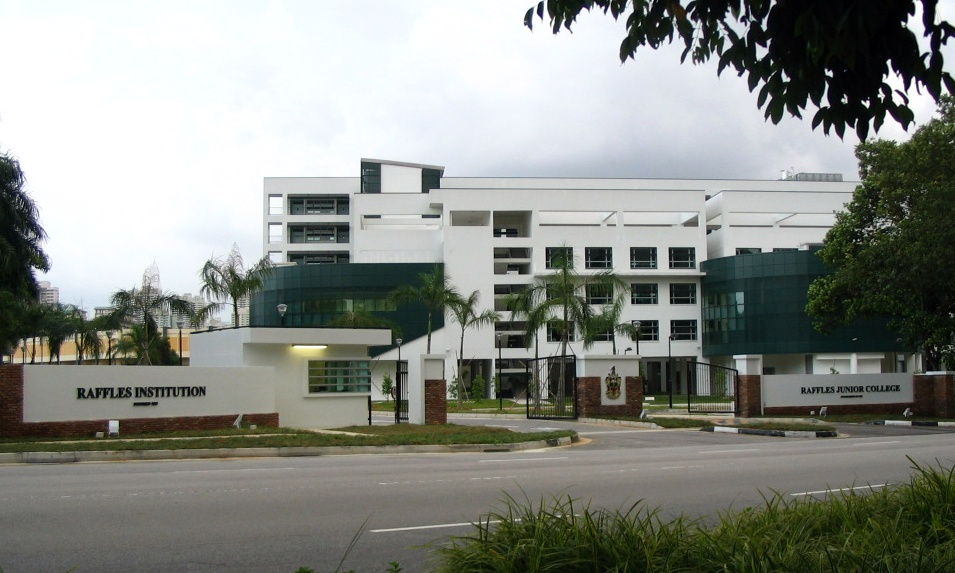
Entrance to RI and RJC

The Raffles Institution Year 1 - 4 campus consists of six main blocks on 18.65 hectares of land.

=== Rajaratnam Block ===
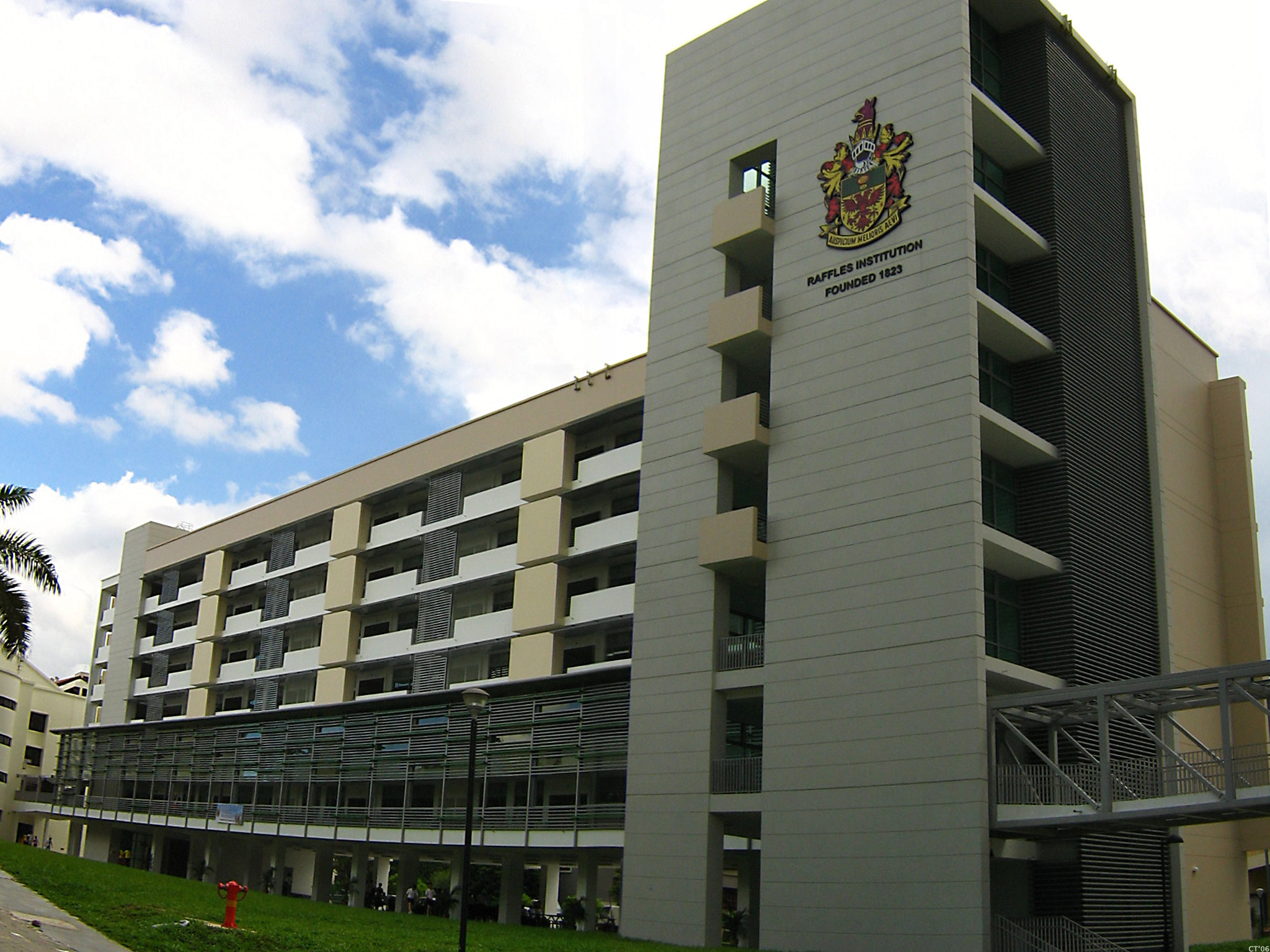
Rajaratnam Block

The seven-storey Rajaratnam Block was completed in 2006 and is located beside the Sheares Block. It is named in memory of the late S. Rajaratnam.

=== Yusof Ishak Block (Former Admin Block) ===
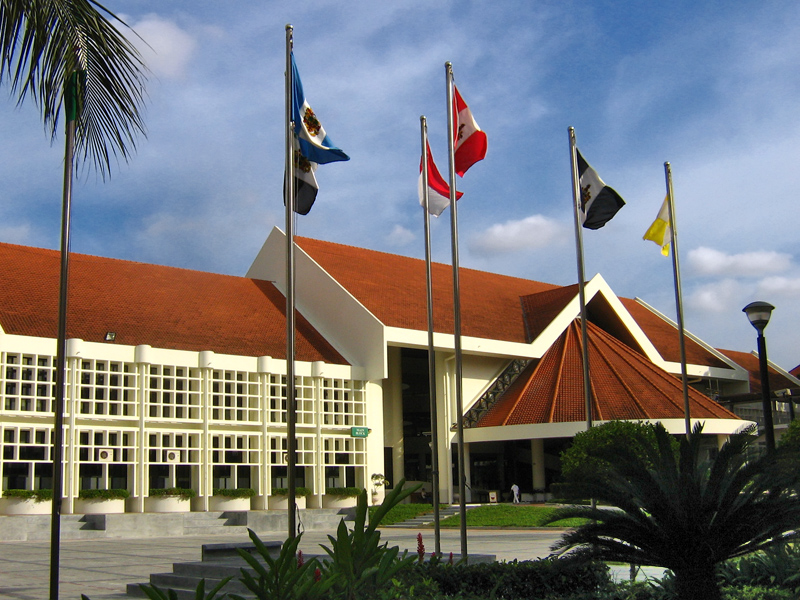
Raffles Institution Yusof Ishak Block

The main building is the Yusof Ishak Block, comprising offices, staff rooms, lecture theatres, study areas and computer labs, as well the Main Atrium. It houses the Year 1-4 General Office and the Raffles Archives & Museum. Major upgrading works were completed in early 2007.

=== Science Hub ===
The Science Hub, opened in 2008, includes facilities for specialised research such as Xploratory-Labs; as well as Chemistry, Physics and Biology labs. It also houses the Discovery Labs, a Microbiology Lab, a Laser Animation/Technology Studio, the Materials Science Lab and the Raffles Academy Home Room. It is connected to the Yusof Ishak Block.

=== Hullett Memorial Library / Shaw Foundation Dining Hall ===
The Hullett Memorial Library (HML) stands below the Shaw Foundation Dining Hall, with a staircase leading down to the library. Co-founded by Lim Boon Keng and Song Ong Siang, it was named after RI's longest-serving Headmaster, Richmond William Hullett, in 1923. The library's official founding (even though a library and museum, from which the National Museum originated, had existed for decades prior to 1923) also marked the centenary of the founding of the institution. The library traces its roots to the founding of RI, making it the oldest library in Singapore. The origins of Singapore's National Library lie in the HML.

=== Sports facilities ===
The school's gymnasium underwent renovation in 2010, and was used as a training venue for gymnasts during the 2010 Summer Youth Olympics, together with that in the Year 5-6 campus. The school also has two tennis courts, two basketball courts, two squash courts, and two cricket nets.

Following the re-integration with Raffles Junior College from 2009, more sports facilities are available. Floorball, table tennis, judo and gymnastics are RI sports now able to use the Year 5-6 Campus facilities.

== Notable alumni ==
=== Academia ===
- Tan Eng Chye, President of the National University of Singapore

=== Arts ===
- Abdul Ghani Abdul Hamid, writer, poet and artist
- Alfian Sa'at, writer, poet and playwright
- Ayden Sng, actor, host and musician
- Chandran Nair, writer, poet and artist
- Ho Poh Fun, writer, poet. She was also this school's alumni and teacher.
- Theophilus Kwek, poet, editor and critic

=== Business ===
- Yeo Swee Hee, Singaporean businessman and landowner
- Robert Kuok, Malaysian billionaire, founder of Shangri-La Hotels and Resorts
- Lim Boon Keng, philanthropist and co-founder of OCBC Bank and Singapore Chinese Girls' School
- Peter Lim, billionaire and owner of Valencia CF
- Andrew Ng, British-American computer scientist, former chief scientist at Baidu, and co-founder of Coursera
- Andy Ong, entrepreneur, writer and property investor
- Min-Liang Tan, founder of tech company Razer Inc.

=== Politics ===
Presidents

- Yusof Ishak, 1st President of Singapore
- Benjamin Sheares, 2nd President of Singapore
- Wee Kim Wee, 4th President of Singapore

Prime Ministers and Chief Ministers

- Lee Kuan Yew, 1st Prime Minister of Singapore
- Goh Chok Tong, 2nd Prime Minister of Singapore
- David Marshall, 1st Chief Minister of Singapore
- Lim Yew Hock, 2nd Chief Minister of Singapore

Speakers of Parliament

- E. W. Barker, 2nd Speaker of Parliament
- Abdullah Tarmugi, 7th Speaker of Parliament
- Tan Chuan Jin, 10th Speaker of Parliament
- Seah Kian Peng, 11th Speaker of Parliament

Current Cabinet ministers

- K. Shanmugam, Senior Minister and Minister for Home Affairs
- Chan Chun Sing, Minister for Defence and Minister-in-charge of the Public Service
- Ong Ye Kung, Minister for Health
- Desmond Lee, Minister for Education
- Jeffrey Siow, Minister for Transport
- Zaqy Mohamad, Acting Minister-in-charge of Muslim Affairs

People's Action Party Members of Parliament (MPs)

- Saktiandi Supaat, MP for Bishan–Toa Payoh GRC

Workers' Party Members of Parliament (MPs)

- He Ting Ru, MP for Sengkang GRC
- Jamus Lim, MP for Sengkang GRC
- Dennis Tan, MP for Hougang SMC
- Kenneth Tiong, MP for Aljunied GRC

Progress Singapore Party politicians

- Tan Cheng Bock, founder of the Progress Singapore Party
- Leong Mun Wai, former non-constituency MP and leader of the Progress Singapore Party

Former politicians

- Ahmad Mattar, former Cabinet minister
- Heng Swee Keat, former Cabinet minister
- Howe Yoon Chong, former Cabinet minister
- S. Jayakumar, former Cabinet minister
- Lee Yock Suan, former Cabinet minister
- Lim Hng Kiang, former Cabinet minister
- Raymond Lim, former Cabinet minister
- Othman Wok, former Cabinet minister
- S. Rajaratnam, former Cabinet minister
- Balaji Sadasivan, former People's Action Party MP for Ang Mo Kio GRC
- Png Eng Huat, former Workers' Party MP for Hougang SMC
- Viswa Sadasivan, former Nominated MP

Non-Singaporean politicians

- Abdul Razak Hussein, 2nd Prime Minister of Malaysia
- Aziz Ishak, Malaysian politician
- Michael Chan, British politician
- Sardon Haji Jubir, Malaysian politician
- Tan Cheng Lock, Malaysian politician
- Tony Pua, Malaysian politician
- Ong Kian Ming, Malaysian politician
- Emil Elestianto Dardak, Indonesian politician

=== Public service ===
Defence

- Ng Jui Ping, 2nd Chief of Defence
- Bey Soo Khiang, 3rd Chief of Defence
- Lim Chuan Poh, 4th Chief of Defence
- Perry Lim, 9th Chief of Defence
- Kirpa Ram Vij, former Director, General Staff of the Singapore Armed Forces

Education

- Ong Teck Chin, former principal of Anglo-Chinese School (Independent)
- Wong Siew Hoong, former Director-General of the Ministry of Education and headmaster of RI

Legal

- T. S. Sinnathuray, Supreme Court judge
- Choor Singh, Supreme Court judge
- Ahmad Mohamed Ibrahim, 1st Attorney-General of Singapore
- Walter Woon, 5th Attorney-General of Singapore
- Charles Gregory Pestana, usher of the Second Magistrate's Court.

Foreign affairs

- Albert Chua, former Permanent Representative of Singapore to the United Nations
- Tommy Koh, former Permanent Representative of Singapore to the United Nations

Others

- Ambat Ravi S Menon, managing director of the Monetary Authority of Singapore
- Tee Tua Ba, former Commissioner of Police
- Andreas Emil Lange, former Private Secretary to Charles Brooke, Rajah of Sarawak and the son of Mads Johansen Lange and Nyai Kenyer princess of Bali and uncle of Ibrahim of Johor, the Sultan of Johor

=== Sports ===
- Au-Yeong Pak Kuan, former national footballer
- Daphne Chia, former national rhythmic gymnastics athlete, competed at the 2014 Commonwealth Games
- Choo Seng Quee, famed national football coach in the 1970s
- Quah Kim Song, former national footballer
- Soh Rui Yong, two-time SEA Games Marathon Champion and Singapore national record holder at 5,000m, 10,000m, Half Marathon and Marathon
- Cherie Tan, Bowling World Champion, six-time SEA Games Gold Medalist, two-time Asian Games Gold medalist

=== Religion ===
- Kong Hee, founder and pastor of City Harvest Church
- Shi Ming Yi, Buddhist monk and former chief executive officer of Ren Ci Hospital and Medicare Centre

=== Others ===
- Subhas Anandan, Singaporean criminal lawyer
- Prince Azim of Brunei
- Lim Bo Seng, Singapore-based Chinese resistance fighter during World War II
- T. A. Sinnathuray, Malaysian professor of obstetrics and gynaecology
- Robert M. Solomon, Bishop of the Methodist Church in Singapore
- Leaena Tambyah, Singaporean social worker and founder of the first school for children with multiple disabilities in Singapore
- Song Ong Siang, lawyer, community leader and co-founder of the Singapore Chinese Girls' School

== See also ==
- Education in Singapore

== Bibliography ==
- Wijeysingha, Eugene et al., (1992), One Man's Vision - Raffles Institution in Focus.
- Wijeysingha, Eugene (1985), The Eagle Breeds a Gryphon. ISBN 981-00-2054-6
- Raffles Programme. "Raffles Programme - Nurturing the Thinker, Leader and Pioneer" Archived 9 August 2005 at the Wayback Machine, Raffles Family of Schools, 2006, retrieved 7 December 2006.
- Seet, K. K. (1983). A place for the people (pp. 6–16). Singapore: Times Books International. ISBN 978-9971-65-097-1
- Wijeysingha, E. (1963). A history of Raffles Institution, 1823-1963. Singapore: University Education Press. OCLC 36660
- Makepeace, Walter; Brooke, Gilbert E.; Braddell, Roland St. J. (Eds.). (1991) [1921]. One hundred years of Singapore. Singapore: Oxford University Press. OCLC 473736327
- Ng Sow Chan (1991). She is from the East (她来自东 /Ta lai zi dong). Singapore: Raffles Institution. OCLC 48176153
