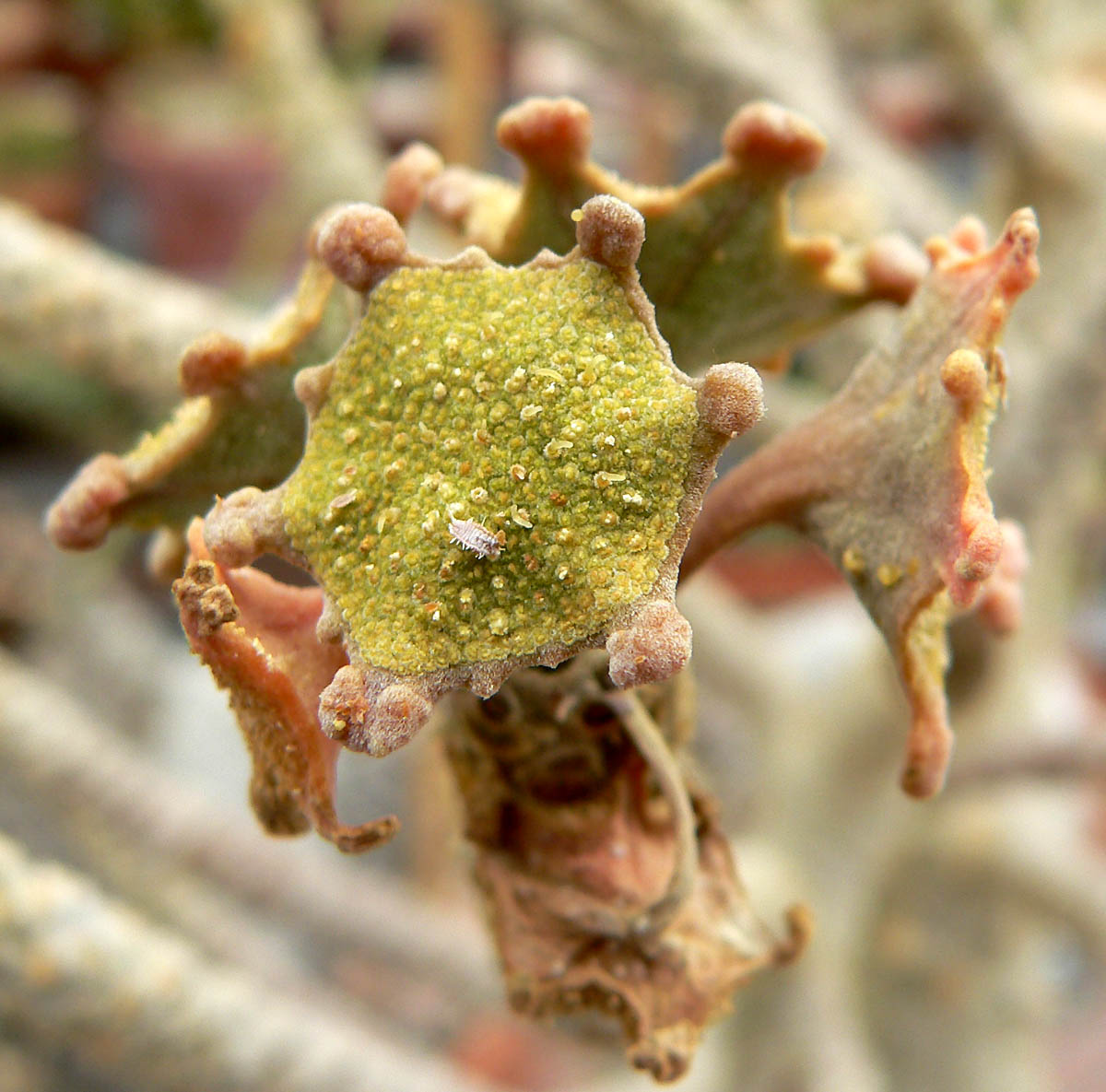
- Dorstenia gigas

Scientific classification
- Kingdom: Plantae
- Clade: Embryophytes
- Clade: Tracheophytes
- Clade: Spermatophytes
- Clade: Angiosperms
- Clade: Eudicots
- Clade: Rosids
- Order: Rosales
- Family: Moraceae
- Tribe: Dorstenieae; Dumort.

= Dorstenieae =

Tribe of flowering plants

Dorstenieae is a tribe within the plant family Moraceae. The tribe includes eight genera and about 120 species.

== Genera ==
- Bleekrodea
- Bosqueiopsis
- Brosimum – Breadnut
- Bosqueiopsis
- Broussonetia
- Dorstenia
- Fatoua
- Helianthostylis
- Malaisia
- Scyphosyce
- Sloetia
- Trilepisium – Urnfigs
- Trymatococcus
- Utsetela
