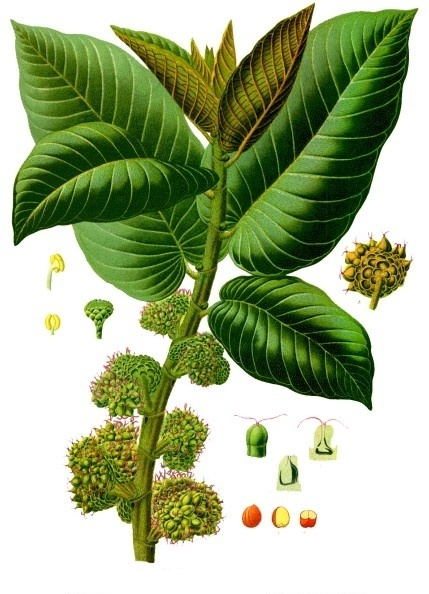
- Castilla elastica

Scientific classification
- Kingdom: Plantae
- Clade: Tracheophytes
- Clade: Angiosperms
- Clade: Eudicots
- Clade: Rosids
- Order: Rosales
- Family: Moraceae
- Tribe: Castilleae; C.C.Berg

= Castilleae =

Tribe of flowering plants

The Castilleae are a tribe within the plant family Moraceae. It includes eight to 11 genera and 55–60 species including Castilla, the Panama rubber tree.

Members of the tribe are primarily Neotropical with two Afrotropical genera, one genus in New Guinea, and one in New Caledonia.

The tribe's distinctive inflorescence is unisexual in monoecious species, with discoid to urceolate receptacles with involucrate bracts. Other characteristics of the group include septate wood fibers and self-pruning branches.

== Castilleae and Ficus ==
Recent phylogenetic studies have highlighted a close sister relationship with the Ficus and have strongly supported the monophyly of the clade containing the Castilleae and Ficus. The ancestral state of this clade and the origin of figs' distinctive inflorescence—the syconium—was disputed until recently, but new phylogenetic analyses suggest that the evolution of entomophily and of an involucre of bracts surrounding the flower primordia preceded the divergence of these two groups, estimated to have occurred at least 83 Mya.

== Genera ==
- Antiaris
- Antiaropsis
- Castilla
- Helicostylis
- Maquira
- Mesogyne
- Naucleopsis
- Perebea
- Poulsenia
- Pseudolmedia
- Sparattosyce
