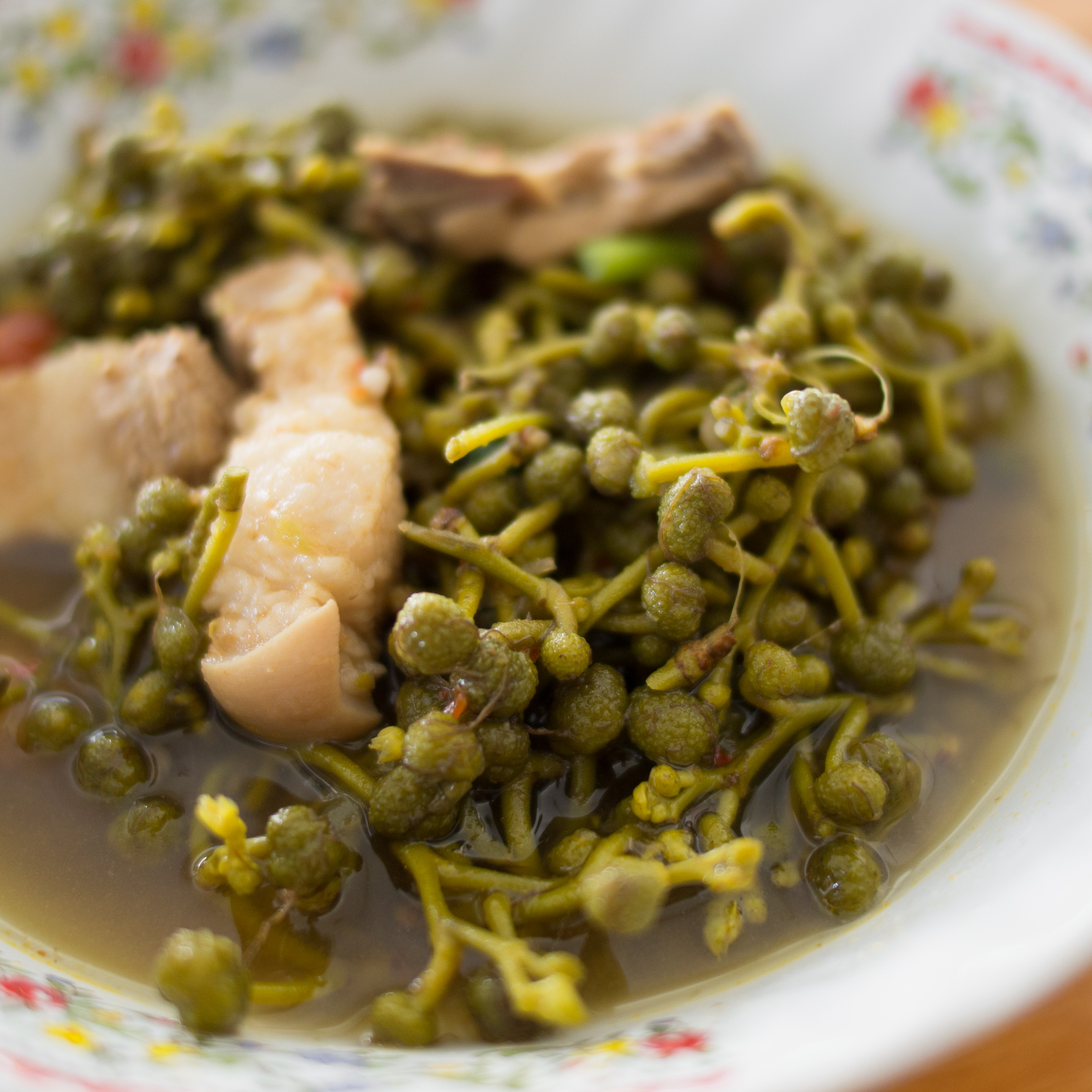
- Kaeng dok salae, a Thai dish made with Broussonetia kurzii flower buds

Scientific classification
- Kingdom: Plantae
- Clade: Tracheophytes
- Clade: Angiosperms
- Clade: Eudicots
- Clade: Rosids
- Order: Rosales
- Family: Moraceae
- Genus: Allaeanthus
- Species: A. kurzii

Binomial name
- Allaeanthus kurzii (Hook.f.) Corner

= Allaeanthus kurzii =

Species of flowering plant

Allaeanthus kurzii is a species of flowering plant in the family Moraceae. Its synonym is Broussonetia kurzii. The synonym is an old name and because of its prefix "Broussonetia", sometimes taxonomically misplaced to Broussonetia group.

== Distribution and habitat ==
It is a dioecious shrub native to Southeast Asia where it is found in tropical rainforests or seasonal tropical forests.

== Uses ==
Known as salae (สะแล) in Thailand, this species is valued as a medicinal plant. Its little spherical flower buds are also a food item in Thai cuisine.

== See also ==
- List of Thai dishes
