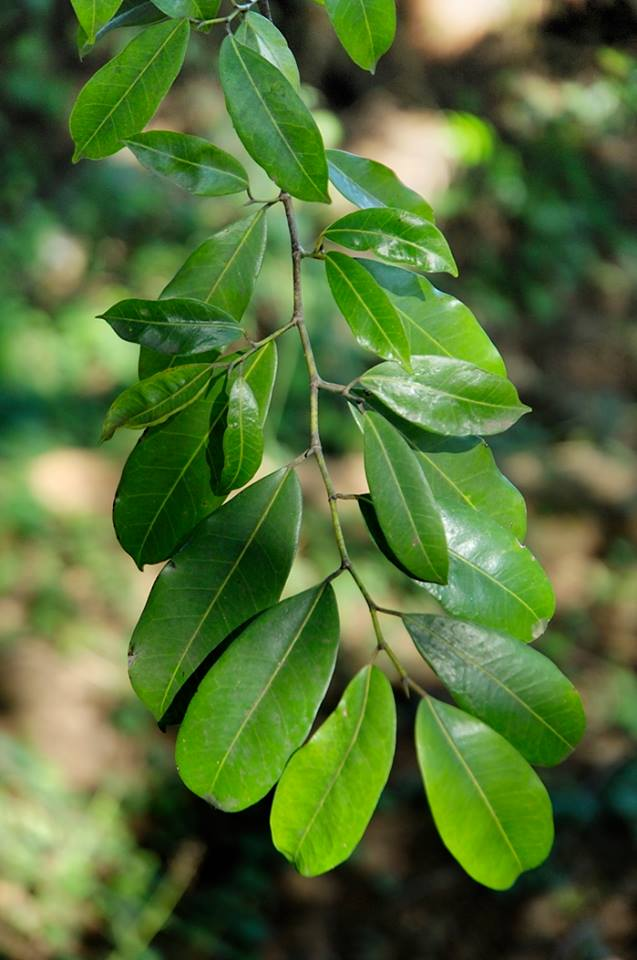

Conservation status
- Least Concern (IUCN 3.1)

Scientific classification
- Kingdom: Plantae
- Clade: Tracheophytes
- Clade: Angiosperms
- Clade: Eudicots
- Clade: Rosids
- Order: Rosales
- Family: Moraceae
- Genus: Trilepisium
- Species: T. madagascariense

Binomial name
- Trilepisium madagascariense DC.

Synonyms
- Bosqueia angolensis Ficalho; Bosqueia boiviniana Cordem. ex Baill.; Bosqueia calcicola Leandri; Bosqueia carvalhoana Engl.; Bosqueia cerasiflora Volkens ex Engl.; Bosqueia danguyana Leandri; Bosqueia manongarivensis Leandri; Bosqueia occidentalis Leandri; Bosqueia orientalis Leandri; Bosqueia phoberos Thouars ex Baill.; Bosqueia phoberos Baill.; Bosqueia thouarsiana Cordem. ex Baill.; Bosqueia thouarsiana var. acuminata Baill.; Bosqueia thouarsiana var. pyriformis Baill.; Bosqueia welwitschii Engl.; Pontya excelsa A.Chev.

= Trilepisium madagascariense =

Urnfig

Species of tree

Trilepisium madagascariense, the urnfig or false-fig, is a species of plant in the family Moraceae, with an extensive range in the subtropical and tropical Afrotropics. It grows to a medium-sized or large tree in primary or secondary forest, or in forest patches, and is rarely cultivated.

== Range and habitat ==
It is native to tropical and subtropical West and Central Africa, and occurs southwards to Zimbabwe, Mozambique and the Soutpansberg, South Africa. It is also found on Madagascar and Annobón island. The closely related T. gymnandrum occurs on Silhouette Island, Seychelles.

It grows in evergreen and semi-deciduous forests, flooded forests or forest patches and often grows along rivers and streams, extending on to the borders of savanna. It is found at elevations of up to 2,000 m and higher. Its status varies from rare to locally abundant and dominant.

== Description ==
They are usually short and twisted bole and is often fluted at the base, with or without buttresses. Large trees may be 60 cm to 1½ m in girth, and 30 m high. The smooth, grey bark is very lenticellate and exudes a cream-coloured latex when damaged. The yellowish to pinkish slash turns purple-red as it dries. It usually branches high up to form a small and loosely pyramidal crown with drooping twigs. Stipules of the terminal buds eventually leave annular scars.

The glossy and very dark elliptic leaves have a prominent driptip, and measure up to 14 cm long. They are glossy below, and have two small lobes at the base.

The flowers appear in spring and are arranged in a whitish to mauve puff. The puff is about 1 cm in diameter, and consists of staminate male flowers and pistillate female flowers, without perianths, which obscure the view of the receptacle. The flowers protrude from the open apex of an urn-shaped receptacle which is about 1.5 cm long.

The fig-like fruit, embedded in fleshy receptacles, are some 2 cm long. They are ellipsoidal in shape and hold a nutlet each. Ripe fruit have the appearance of blue plums or elongated figs.

== Uses and species associations ==
The wood is suitable for furniture, and the sap yields a red dye. Roasted seeds are eaten and the trees are sometimes cultivated. It has many traditional uses.

A methanol extract, fractions and isoliquiritigenin from the stem bark has been shown to possess antidiarrhoeal activities, and previously unknown trilepisflavan and trilepisuimic acid compounds were isolated from it in 2012.

Trilepisium madagascariense is a larval foodplant for the butterfly Cyrestis camillus sublineata.
