= Pseudolmedia manabiensis =

Conservation status
- Critically Endangered (IUCN 3.1)

Scientific classification
- Kingdom: Plantae
- Clade: Tracheophytes
- Clade: Angiosperms
- Clade: Eudicots
- Clade: Rosids
- Order: Rosales
- Family: Moraceae
- Genus: Pseudolmedia
- Species: P. manabiensis

Binomial name
- Pseudolmedia manabiensis C.C.Berg

Species of flowering plant

Pseudolmedia manabiensis is a species of plant in the family Moraceae. It is a tree endemic to Ecuador.
