= Calaunia =

Conservation status
- Critically Endangered (IUCN 3.1)

Scientific classification
- Kingdom: Plantae
- Clade: Embryophytes
- Clade: Tracheophytes
- Clade: Angiosperms
- Clade: Eudicots
- Clade: Rosids
- Order: Rosales
- Family: Moraceae
- Genus: Calaunia; Gudzins. (1964)
- Species: C. negrosensis

Binomial name
- Calaunia negrosensis (Elmer) Grudz. (1964)

Synonyms
- Aphananthe negrosensis Elmer (1909)

Genus of flowering plants

Calaunia negrosensis is a species of flowering plant belonging to the family Moraceae. It is the sole species in genus Calaunia. It is a tree native to the island of Negros in the Philippines.
