= Maquira sclerophylla =

Conservation status
- Least Concern (IUCN 3.1)

Scientific classification
- Kingdom: Plantae
- Clade: Tracheophytes
- Clade: Angiosperms
- Clade: Eudicots
- Clade: Rosids
- Order: Rosales
- Family: Moraceae
- Genus: Maquira
- Species: M. sclerophylla

Binomial name
- Maquira sclerophylla (Ducke) C.C.Berg

Synonyms
- Oldmedioperebea sclerophylla Ducke; Perebea xinguana Standl.

Species of tree

Maquira sclerophylla is a species of flowering plant native to northern and west-central Brazil, the Guianas, and Venezuela in tropical South America. It is a timber tree

In the Pariana region of the Brazilian Amazon, a psychoactive snuff called rapé dos indios was prepared from the fruits of the tree and used ritualistically in dances. By 1984 only the very old knew how to prepare the substance.
