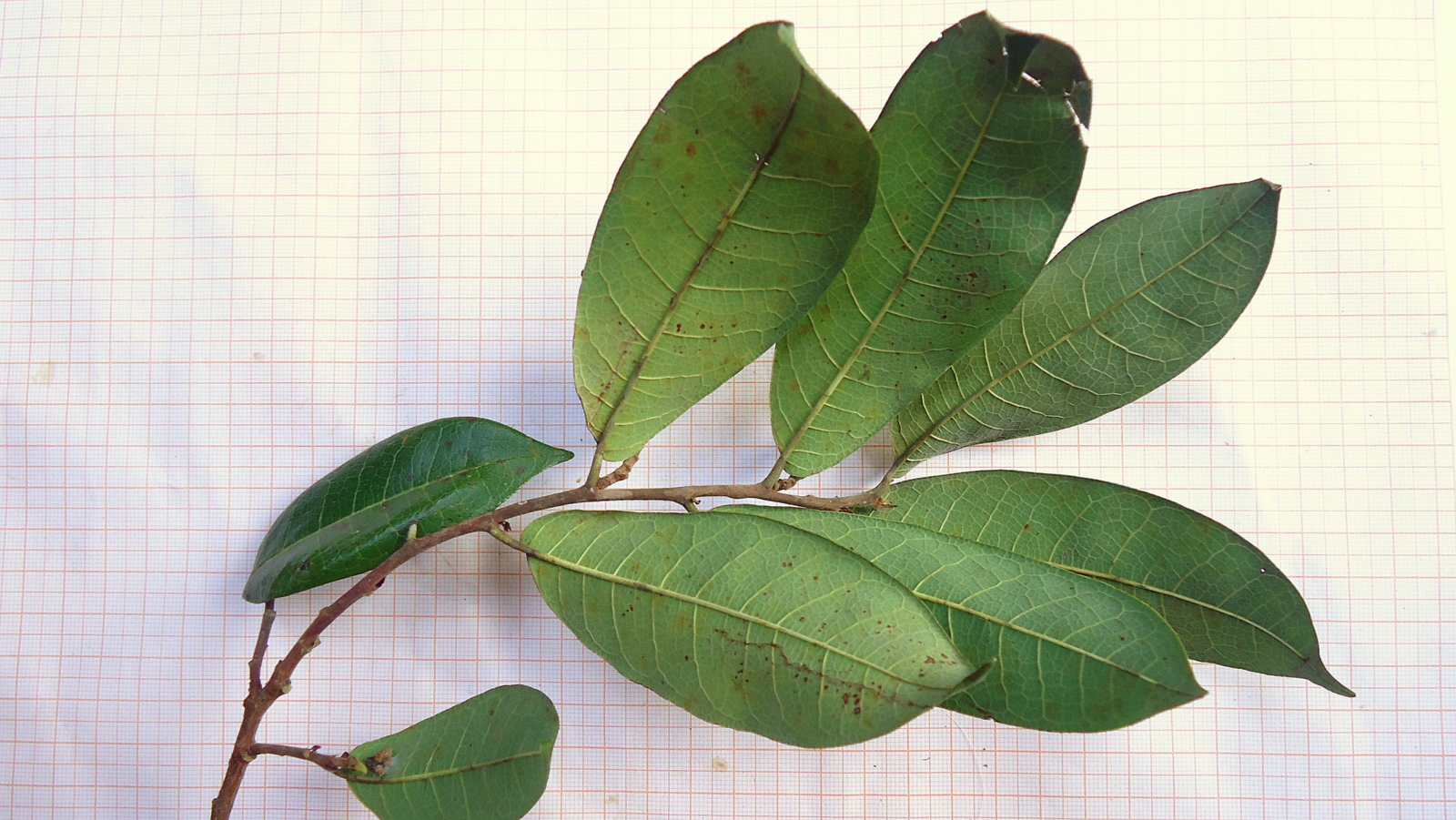

Conservation status
- Least Concern (IUCN 3.1)

Scientific classification
- Kingdom: Plantae
- Clade: Tracheophytes
- Clade: Angiosperms
- Clade: Eudicots
- Clade: Rosids
- Order: Rosales
- Family: Moraceae
- Genus: Helicostylis
- Species: H. tomentosa

Binomial name
- Helicostylis tomentosa (Poepp. & Endl.) Rusby

Synonyms
- Greeneina affinis (Steud. ex Trécul) Kuntze; Greeneina poeppigiana (Mart.) Kuntze; Helicostylis affinis Miq.; Helicostylis duckei A.D.Hawkes; Helicostylis obtusifolia Standl.; Helicostylis podogyne Ducke; Helicostylis poeppigiana (Mart.) Trécul; Helicostylis poeppigiana var. macrophylla Trécul; Olmedia affinis Steud. ex Trécul; Olmedia asperula Standl.; Olmedia poeppigiana Mart.; Olmedia polycephala Pittier; Olmedia tomentosa Poepp. & Endl.; Trymatococcus guanabarinus Duarte

= Helicostylis tomentosa =

Species of tree

Helicostylis tomentosa is a species of flowering plant in the family Moraceae. It is a tree native to Panama and to Bolivia, Brazil, Colombia, Ecuador, the Guianas, Peru, and Venezuela in tropical South America.
