= Naucleopsis glabra =

Conservation status
- Least Concern (IUCN 3.1)

Scientific classification
- Kingdom: Plantae
- Clade: Tracheophytes
- Clade: Angiosperms
- Clade: Eudicots
- Clade: Rosids
- Order: Rosales
- Family: Moraceae
- Genus: Naucleopsis
- Species: N. glabra

Binomial name
- Naucleopsis glabra Spruce ex Pittier

Synonyms
- Duguetia glabra Britton; Ogcodeia acreana Mildbr.; Ogcodeia glabra (Spruce ex Pittier) Mildbr.; Ogcodeia pallescens Ducke; Ogcodeia sandwithiana Mildbr.; Ogcodeia tamamuri J.F.Macbr.; Ogcodeia tessmannii Mildbr.

Species of tree

Naucleopsis glabra is a South American flowering plant species in the family Moraceae. It is a tree native to lowland Amazon rainforest in Bolivia, northern and west-central Brazil, Colombia, Ecuador, Peru, French Guiana, and Suriname.

The plant is used medicinally by people in parts of the Peruvian Amazon. Its bark is antimicrobial, especially to gram-positive bacteria.
