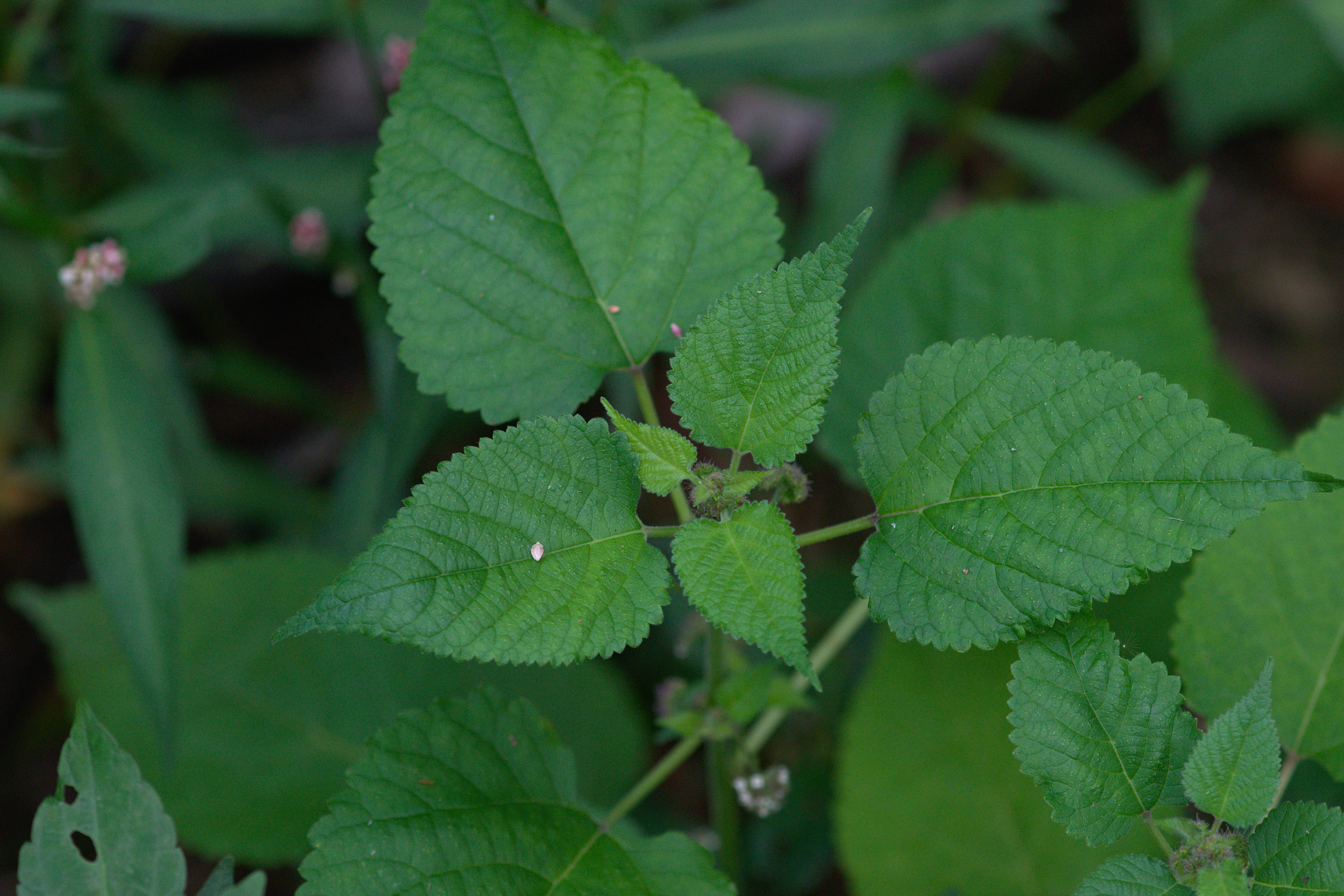

Scientific classification
- Kingdom: Plantae
- Clade: Tracheophytes
- Clade: Angiosperms
- Clade: Eudicots
- Clade: Rosids
- Order: Rosales
- Family: Moraceae
- Genus: Fatoua
- Species: F. villosa

Binomial name
- Fatoua villosa (Thunberg) Nakai

Synonyms
- Fatoua aspera (Gaudich.) Fatoua cordata (Gaudich.) Fatoua globulifera (Miq.) Fatoua japonica (Thunb.) Blume Fatoua lanceolata (Decne.) Fatoua scabra (Miq.) Fatoua subcordata (Gaudich.) Boehmeriopsis pallida (Kom.) Fleurya glechomifolia (Miq.) Fleurya globulifera (Miq.) Fleurya scabra (Miq.) Urtica japonica (Thunb.) Urtica villosa (Thunberg)

= Fatoua villosa =

Species of flowering plant

Fatoua villosa is an annual herb in the Moraceae (mulberry) family. Common names include mulberry weed, crabweed, or hairy crabweed in English, kuwakusa (クワクサ; 桑草) in Japanese, and shuǐ shémá (水蛇麻) or xiǎo shémá (小蛇麻) in Mandarin. It is native to Eastern Asia, some Pacific islands, and parts of Australia, including in two Australian states (Western Australia and Queensland), the Bismarck Archipelago, China, Indonesia (Java, Maluku, Sulawesi and the Lesser Sunda Islands), Japan, Korea, New Guinea, the Philippines, the Solomon Islands, Taiwan, Thailand and Vietnam. It has become an invasive species in the United States where it grows in disturbed areas such as flowerbeds, greenhouses, and agricultural fields.

== Description ==
F. villosa is an annual herb, and sometimes perennial herb in the deep south of the US. The entire plant is covered in both glandular and recurved hairs giving the plant a sticky feeling to the touch. The leaves resemble the leaves of mulberry giving rise to the common name of mulberry-weed. The leaves are heart shaped and up to 10 cm long with a crenate leaf margin. At the base of each leaf is a pair of stipules. It is a monoecious plant meaning that it has separate male and female flowers on the same plant. The male and female flowers are aggregated into axillary clusters. The fruit is single seeded and explosively shoots the seed up to several meters.

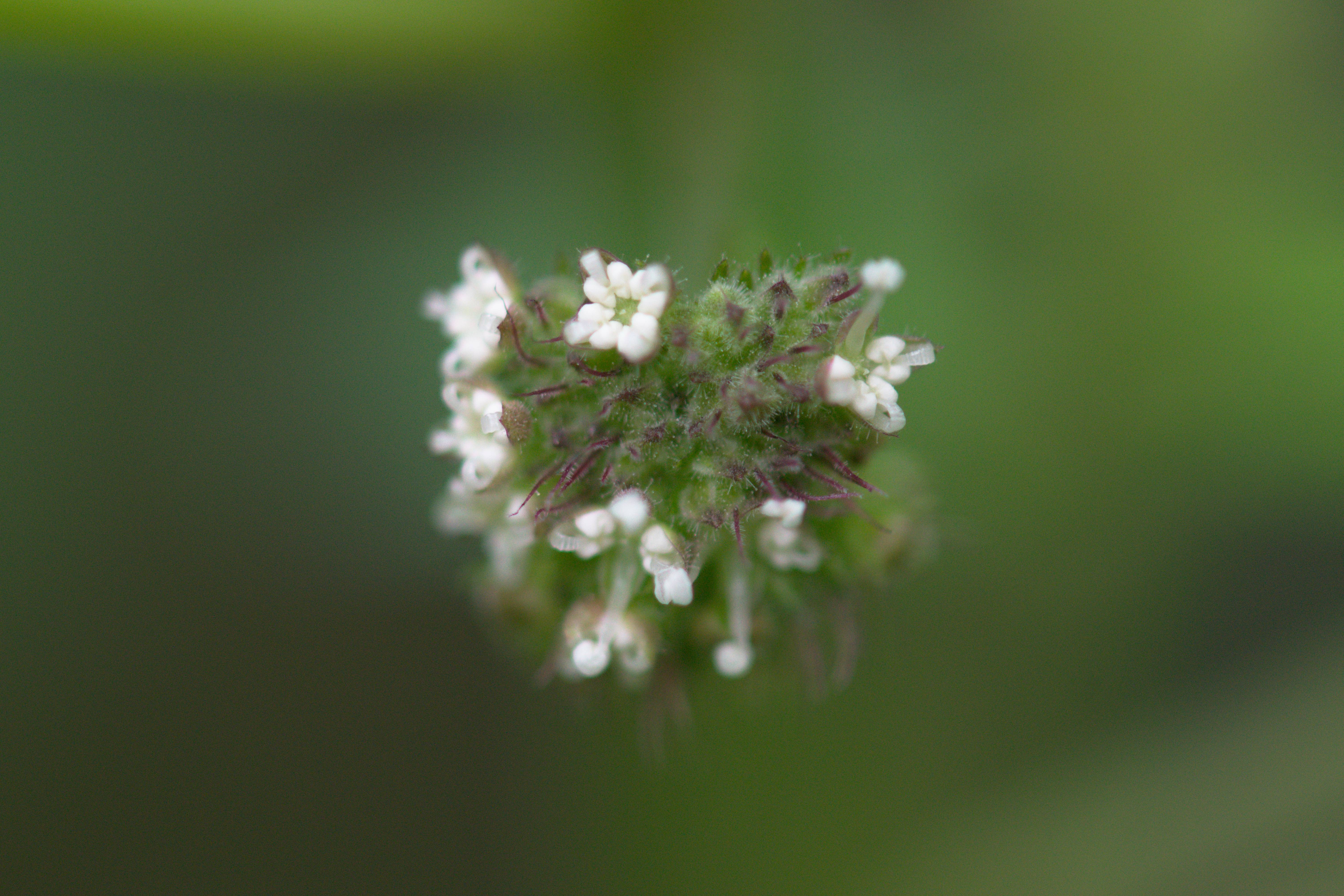
Flower head of Fatoua villosa showing pistillate and staminate flowers.

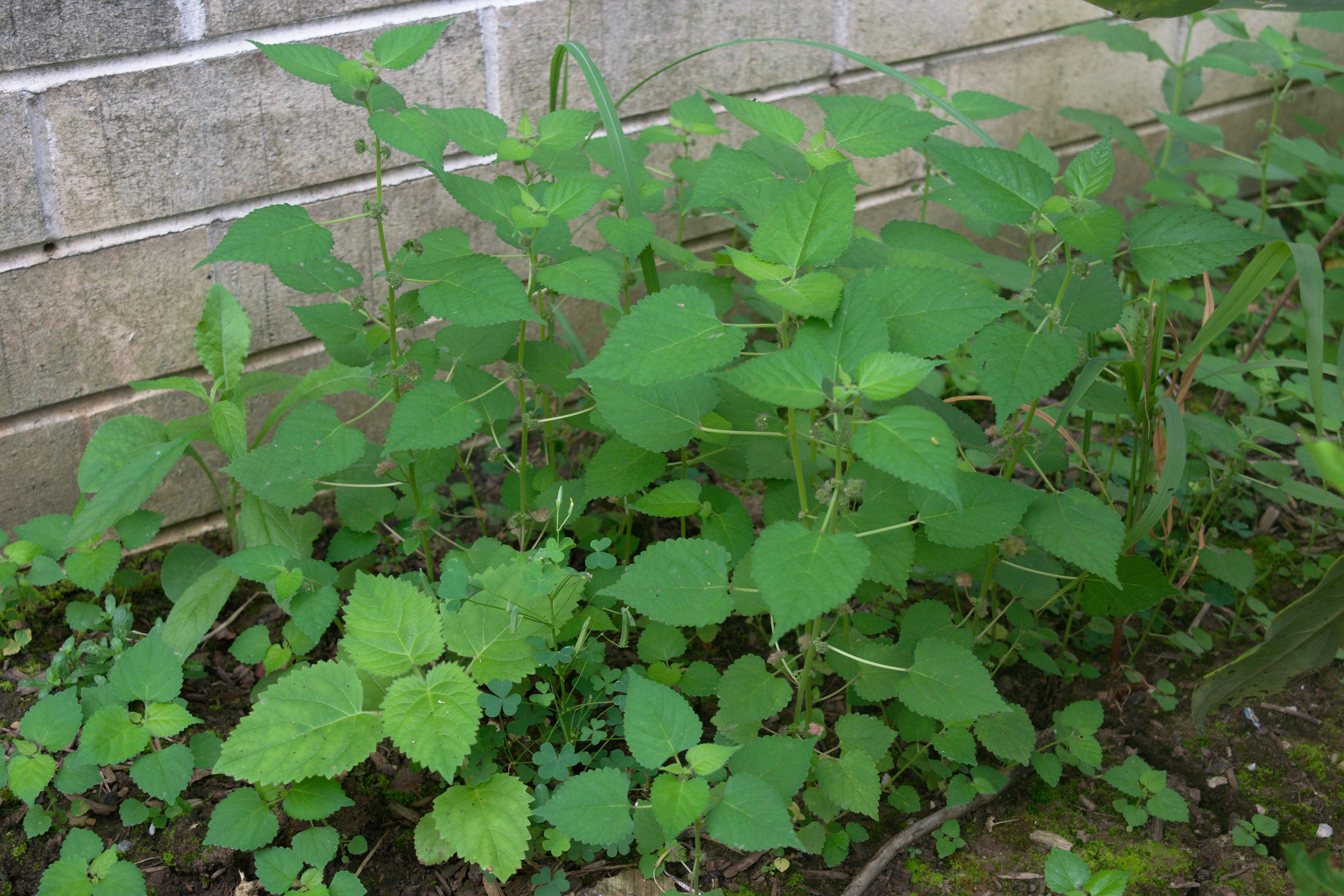
Fatoua villosa growing in a typical habitat such as a weedy flowerbed

== Invasive ==
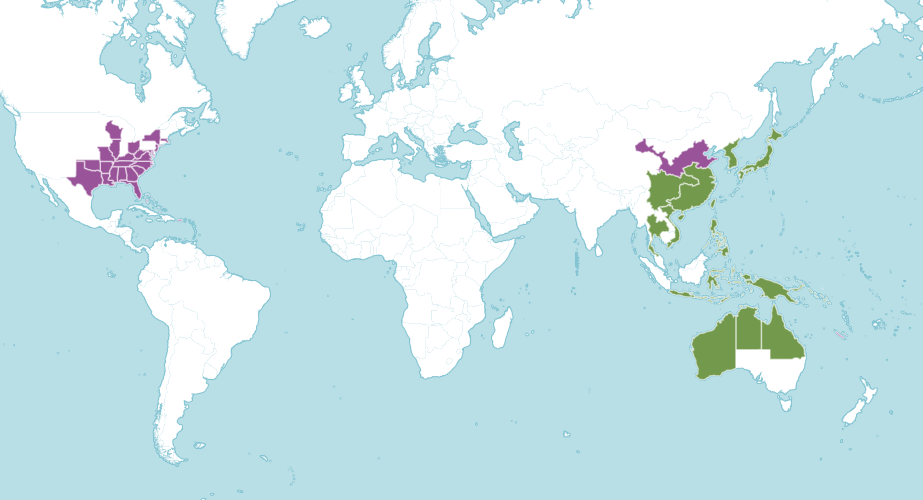
The native range of Fatoua villosa is shown in green, while the invasive range is in purple.

Mulberry weed has been collected extensively in flowerbeds and greenhouses which strongly suggests that the plant is spread via horticultural material. It was first reported in Louisiana in 1964 and has since spread as far north as Michigan and Massachusetts and as far west as California. It will likely continue to spread and may become more invasive in the United States.
