= Naucleopsis oblongifolia =

Conservation status
- Least Concern (IUCN 3.1)

Scientific classification
- Kingdom: Plantae
- Clade: Tracheophytes
- Clade: Angiosperms
- Clade: Eudicots
- Clade: Rosids
- Order: Rosales
- Family: Moraceae
- Genus: Naucleopsis
- Species: N. oblongifolia

Binomial name
- Naucleopsis oblongifolia (Kuhlm.) Carauta

Synonyms
- Brosimum mello-barretoi Standl.; Naucleopsis mello-barretoi (Standl.) C.C.Berg; Ogcodeia oblongifolia Kuhlm.

Species of flowering plant

Naucleopsis oblongifolia is a species of flowering plant in the family Moraceae. It is a tree native to northern and eastern Brazil, Colombia, Ecuador, Peru and Venezuela in tropical South America. It grows in lowland Amazon rainforest and the Atlantic Forest of eastern Brazil.
