= Pseudolmedia hirtula =

Conservation status
- Vulnerable (IUCN 3.1)

Scientific classification
- Kingdom: Plantae
- Clade: Tracheophytes
- Clade: Angiosperms
- Clade: Eudicots
- Clade: Rosids
- Order: Rosales
- Family: Moraceae
- Genus: Pseudolmedia
- Species: P. hirtula

Binomial name
- Pseudolmedia hirtula Kuhlm.
- Distribution of Pseudolmedia hirtula in southeast and south Brazil

Species of tree

Pseudolmedia hirtula is a species of plant in the family Moraceae also known as the fig tree family. Endemic to Brazil's Atlantic rain forest, it is threatened by habitat loss, caused by humans using slash and burn methods to make room for more cropland and grazing pastures. It is listed as a vulnerable species on the IUCN red list

== Description ==
Pseudolmedia hirtula is a flowering monoecious species so it has both male and female flowers that bloom. The male flowers are disk like in shape and have triangular, oblong, or spear shaped bract, which are leaves that have formed around the outside of a flower to help protect it. The female flowers will have triangular to oval shaped bract. Fruit from the tree is ellipsoid to oblong in shape. The leaves are oblong to spear shaped that have a tip that tapers to a point, and an acute base, they have pilose hairs, meaning that they will fall off as the leaf ages.

== Distribution ==
Pseudolmedia hirtula is limited to a small part of the Atlantic forest. It is found mainly in São Paulo and Paraná, two states in the southern part of Brazil.

== Conservation ==
Increasing fragmentation of the forests from human actions have reduced the available habitat for Pseudolmedia hirtula. Conservation efforts are being made by non-government organizations to help protect the unique ecosystem. Their main strategy for conservation is to create wildlife corridors to combat the fragmentation, allowing wildlife to cross between the fragments of forest, promoting seed dispersal and gene flow.
