= Helicostylis heterotricha =

Conservation status
- Least Concern (IUCN 3.1)

Scientific classification
- Kingdom: Plantae
- Clade: Tracheophytes
- Clade: Angiosperms
- Clade: Eudicots
- Clade: Rosids
- Order: Rosales
- Family: Moraceae
- Genus: Helicostylis
- Species: H. heterotricha

Binomial name
- Helicostylis heterotricha Ducke

Species of flowering plant

Helicostylis heterotricha is a species of flowering plant in the family Moraceae. It is a tree native to the western Amazon Basin of northern Brazil, Colombia, and Peru. It grows in lowland Amazon rainforest up to 1,000 metres elevation.

The species was described by Adolpho Ducke in 1932.
