= Maillardia montana =

Conservation status
- Least Concern (IUCN 3.1)

Scientific classification
- Kingdom: Plantae
- Clade: Tracheophytes
- Clade: Angiosperms
- Clade: Eudicots
- Clade: Rosids
- Order: Rosales
- Family: Moraceae
- Genus: Maillardia
- Species: M. montana

Binomial name
- Maillardia montana Leandri

Synonyms
- Maillardia mandrarensis Leandri, nom. provis.; Maillardia occidentalis Leandri; Maillardia orientalis Leandri, nom. provis.; Maillardia pendula Fosberg; Trophis montana (Leandri) C.C.Berg

Species of flowering plant

Maillardia montana, is a species of flowering plant in the family Moraceae. It is native to Mayotte, the Aldabras, and Madagascar in the western Indian Ocean. It was first described by Jacques Désiré Leandri in 1948.

== Conservation ==
Maillardia pendula was assessed as a species of Least Concern in the 2020 IUCN Red List.
