= Sparattosyce =

Scientific classification
- Kingdom: Plantae
- Clade: Tracheophytes
- Clade: Angiosperms
- Clade: Eudicots
- Clade: Rosids
- Order: Rosales
- Family: Moraceae
- Tribe: Castilleae
- Genus: Sparattosyce; Bureau (1869)

Species
- 2; see text

Genus of trees

Sparattosyce is a genus of trees in the family Moraceae. The genus is endemic to New Caledonia in the Pacific and contains two species. Its closest relative is Antiaropsis from New Guinea.

== Species ==
The genus consists of the following two species:

- Sparattosyce balansae A.G.Richt. ex Guillaumin
- Sparattosyce dioica Bureau
