= Cotylea =

Cotylea may refer to:

- Cotylea (worm), a sub-order of free-living marine turbellarian flatworms in the order Polycladida
- Saxifraga sect. Cotylea, a section in the plant genus Saxifraga
