= Naucleopsis chiguila =

Conservation status
- Vulnerable (IUCN 3.1)

Scientific classification
- Kingdom: Plantae
- Clade: Tracheophytes
- Clade: Angiosperms
- Clade: Eudicots
- Clade: Rosids
- Order: Rosales
- Family: Moraceae
- Genus: Naucleopsis
- Species: N. chiguila

Binomial name
- Naucleopsis chiguila Benoist

Species of flowering plant

Naucleopsis chiguila is a species of flowering plant in the family Moraceae. It is a tree endemic to Ecuador.
