= Perebea rubra =

Conservation status
- Least Concern (IUCN 3.1)

Scientific classification
- Kingdom: Plantae
- Clade: Tracheophytes
- Clade: Angiosperms
- Clade: Eudicots
- Clade: Rosids
- Order: Rosales
- Family: Moraceae
- Genus: Perebea
- Species: P. rubra

Binomial name
- Perebea rubra (Trécul) C.C.Berg (1998)

Subspecies
- Perebea rubra subsp. glabrifolia (Ducke) C.C.Berg; Perebea rubra subsp. rubra

Synonyms
- Noyera rubra Trécul (1847); Perebea mollis subsp. rubra (Trécul) C.C.Berg (1969)

Species of plant

Perebea rubra is a species of flowering plant in the genus Perebea of the family Moraceae. It is a tree native to tropical South America, ranging from southeastern Colombia to Ecuador, Peru, northern and west-central Brazil, Suriname, and French Guiana.

== Habitat ==
Perebea rubra is a semi-aquatic terrestrial plant. It is native to lowland tropical Amazon rain forest.

== Subspecies ==
Two subspecies are accepted.

- Perebea rubra subsp. glabrifolia (Ducke) C.C.Berg (synonym Perebea glabrifolia) – Ecuador, Peru, northern and west-central Brazil
- Perebea rubra subsp. rubra – southeastern Colombia, western Brazil, Suriname, and French Guiana
