= Perebea rubra subsp. glabrifolia =

Conservation status
- Critically Endangered (IUCN 2.3)

Scientific classification
- Kingdom: Plantae
- Clade: Tracheophytes
- Clade: Angiosperms
- Clade: Eudicots
- Clade: Rosids
- Order: Rosales
- Family: Moraceae
- Genus: Perebea
- Species: P. rubra
- Subspecies: P. r. subsp. glabrifolia

Trinomial name
- Perebea rubra subsp. glabrifolia (Ducke) C.C.Berg (1998)

Synonyms
- Noyera glabrifolia Ducke (1932); Perebea glabrifolia (Ducke) C.C.Berg (1969)

Species of flowering plant

Perebea rubra subsp. glabrifolia is a subspecies of flowering plant in the family Moraceae. It is native to Ecuador, Peru, and northern and west-central Brazil.
