= Trilepisium gymnandrum =

Conservation status
- Critically Endangered (IUCN 3.1)

Scientific classification
- Kingdom: Plantae
- Clade: Tracheophytes
- Clade: Angiosperms
- Clade: Eudicots
- Clade: Rosids
- Order: Rosales
- Family: Moraceae
- Genus: Trilepisium
- Species: T. gymnandrum

Binomial name
- Trilepisium gymnandrum (Baker) J.Gerlach

Synonyms
- Bosqueia gymnandra Baker (1877)

Species of tree

Trilepisium gymnandrum is a species of Trilepisium that is endemic to the Seychelles, where it is threatened by habitat loss. Its natural habitat is subtropical or tropical moist lowland forests. Five mature individuals are known in two sub-populations in the mid to high elevation forests of Silhouette Island. The 18th century populations of the larger Mahé and Praslin islands have presumably been extirpated.

The NPTS has established a new population on Silhouette island.

== See also ==
- Ficus bojeri (Moraceae) – Seychelles endemic
