= Sloetiopsis =

Conservation status
- Least Concern (IUCN 3.1)

Scientific classification
- Kingdom: Plantae
- Clade: Tracheophytes
- Clade: Angiosperms
- Clade: Eudicots
- Clade: Rosids
- Order: Rosales
- Family: Moraceae
- Genus: Sloetiopsis; Engl. (1907)
- Species: S. usambarensis

Binomial name
- Sloetiopsis usambarensis Engl. (1907)

Synonyms
- Neosloetiopsis Engl. (1914); Neosloetiopsis kamerunensis Engl. (1914); Streblus usambarensis (Engl.) C.C.Berg (1988)

Genus of flowering plants

Sloetiopsis usambarensis is a species of flowering plant in the mulberry family, Moraceae. It is the sole species in genus Sloetiopsis. It is a shrub or small tree native to tropical Africa, ranging from Guinea to Côte d'Ivoire in West Africa, from Nigeria to the Democratic Republic of the Congo in west-central Africa, and to Kenya, Tanzania, and Mozambique in eastern Africa.
