= Pseudostreblus =

Conservation status
- Least Concern (IUCN 3.1)

Scientific classification
- Kingdom: Plantae
- Clade: Tracheophytes
- Clade: Angiosperms
- Clade: Eudicots
- Clade: Rosids
- Order: Rosales
- Family: Moraceae
- Genus: Pseudostreblus; Bureau (1873)
- Species: P. indicus

Binomial name
- Pseudostreblus indicus Bureau (1873)

Synonyms
- Streblus indicus (Bureau) Corner (1962)

Genus of flowering plants

Pseudostreblus indicus is a species of flowering plant in the mulberry family, Moraceae. It is the sole species in genus Pseudostreblus. It is a scrambling tree native to southeastern Asia, ranging from Assam through Indochina to Hainan and southern China.
