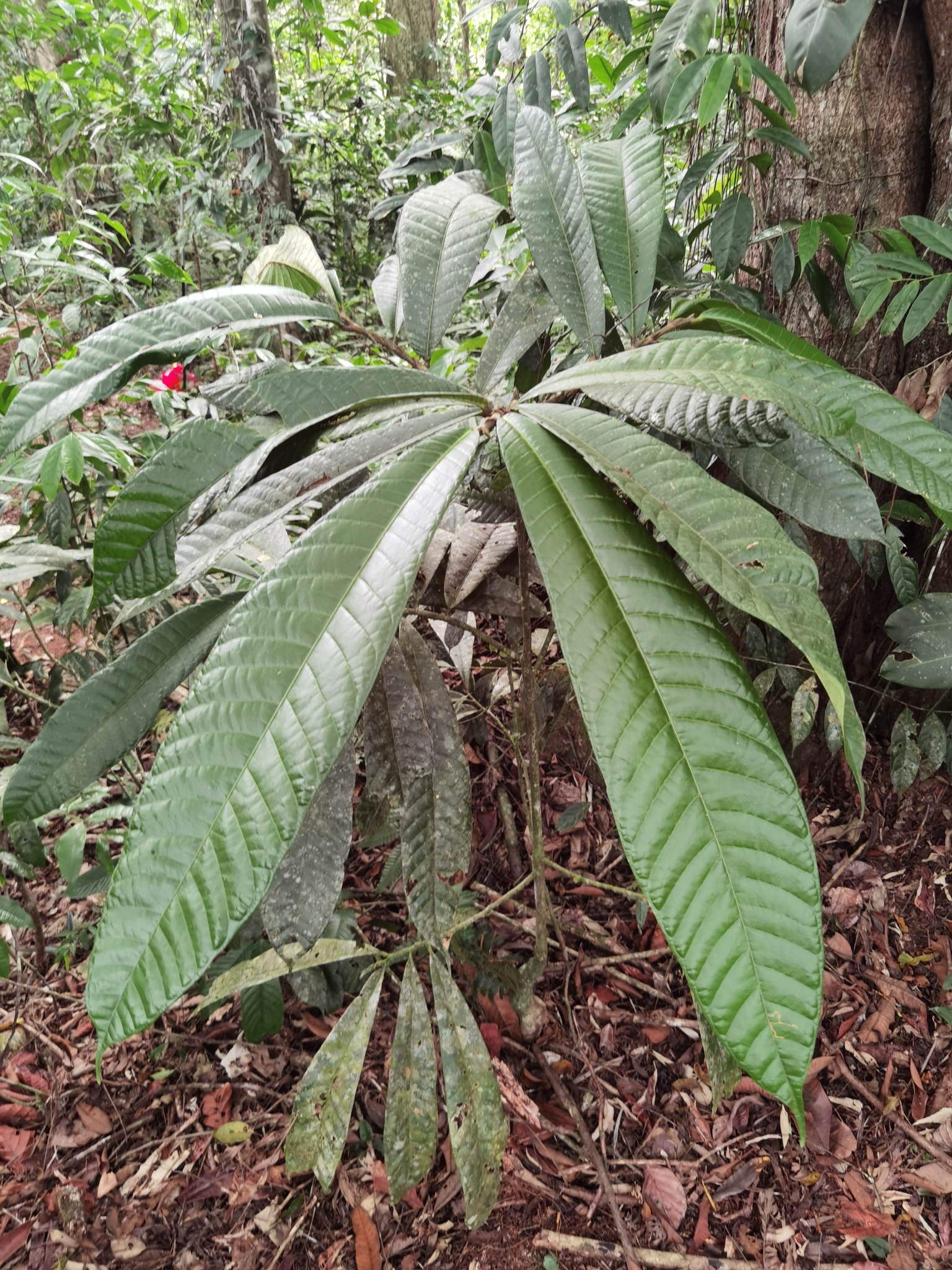
- Naucleopsis naga in Costa Rica

Scientific classification
- Kingdom: Plantae
- Clade: Embryophytes
- Clade: Tracheophytes
- Clade: Angiosperms
- Clade: Eudicots
- Clade: Rosids
- Order: Rosales
- Family: Moraceae
- Tribe: Castilleae
- Genus: Naucleopsis; Miq.

Species
- 25; see text

Synonyms
- Acanthosphaera Warb. (1906 publ. 1907); Ogcodeia Bureau (1873); Palmolmedia Ducke (1939); Uleodendron Rauschert (1982)

= Naucleopsis =

Genus of flowering plants

Naucleopsis is a genus of flowering plants in the mulberry family, Moraceae. It includes 25 species native to the tropical Americas, ranging from Honduras to Bolivia and southeastern Brazil.

== Species ==
25 species are accepted.

- Naucleopsis caloneura (Huber) Ducke
- Naucleopsis capirensis C.C.Berg
- Naucleopsis chiguila Benoist
- Naucleopsis concinna (Standl.) C.C.Berg
- Naucleopsis francisci C.C.Berg
- Naucleopsis glabra Spruce ex Pittier
- Naucleopsis guianensis (Mildbr.) C.C.Berg
- Naucleopsis herrerensis C.C.Berg
- Naucleopsis humilis C.C.Berg
- Naucleopsis imitans (Ducke) C.C.Berg
- Naucleopsis inaequalis (Ducke) C.C.Berg
- Naucleopsis insculptula Ducke
- Naucleopsis jamariensis C.C.Berg
- Naucleopsis krukovii (Standl.) C.C.Berg
- Naucleopsis macrophylla Miq.
- Naucleopsis naga Pittier
- Naucleopsis oblongifolia (Kuhlm.) Carauta
- Naucleopsis pseudonaga (Mildbr.) C.C.Berg
- Naucleopsis riparia C.C.Berg
- Naucleopsis stipularis Ducke
- Naucleopsis straminea C.C.Berg
- Naucleopsis ternstroemiiflora (Mildbr.) C.C.Berg
- Naucleopsis tubulata Al.Santos & Romaniuc
- Naucleopsis ulei (Warb.) Ducke
- Naucleopsis velutina C.C.Berg
