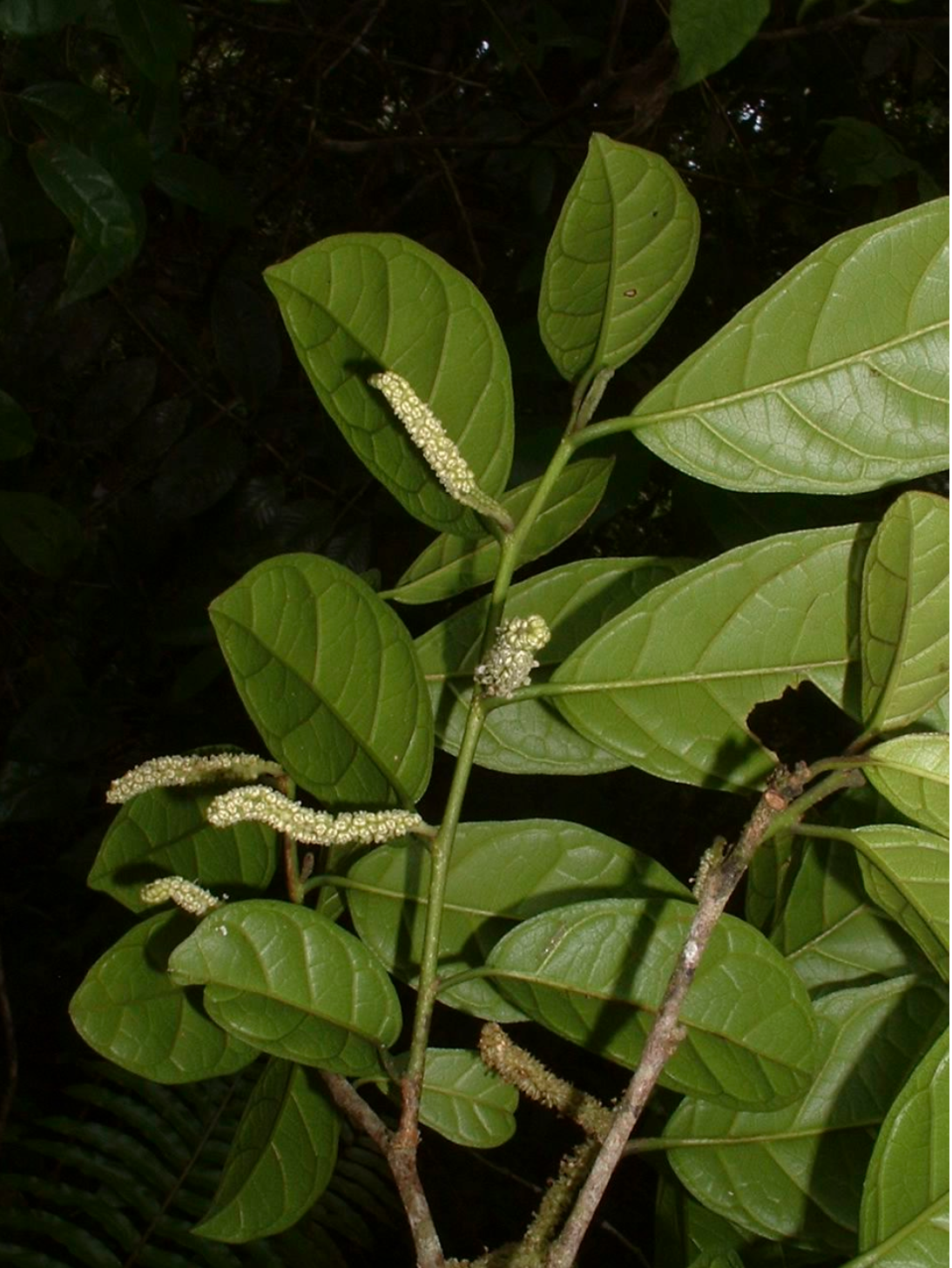

Scientific classification
- Kingdom: Plantae
- Clade: Tracheophytes
- Clade: Angiosperms
- Clade: Eudicots
- Clade: Rosids
- Order: Rosales
- Family: Moraceae
- Genus: Ampalis; Bojer

Species
- Ampalis dimepate (Bureau) E.M.Gardner; Ampalis mauritiana (Jacq.) Urb.

= Ampalis =

Genus of flowering plants

Ampalis is a genus of flowering plants in the mulberry family Moraceae. It includes two species native to Madagascar and the Comoro Islands.

- Ampalis dimepate (Bureau) E.M.Gardner – Madagascar
- Ampalis mauritiana (Jacq.) Urb. – Comoros and Madagascar
