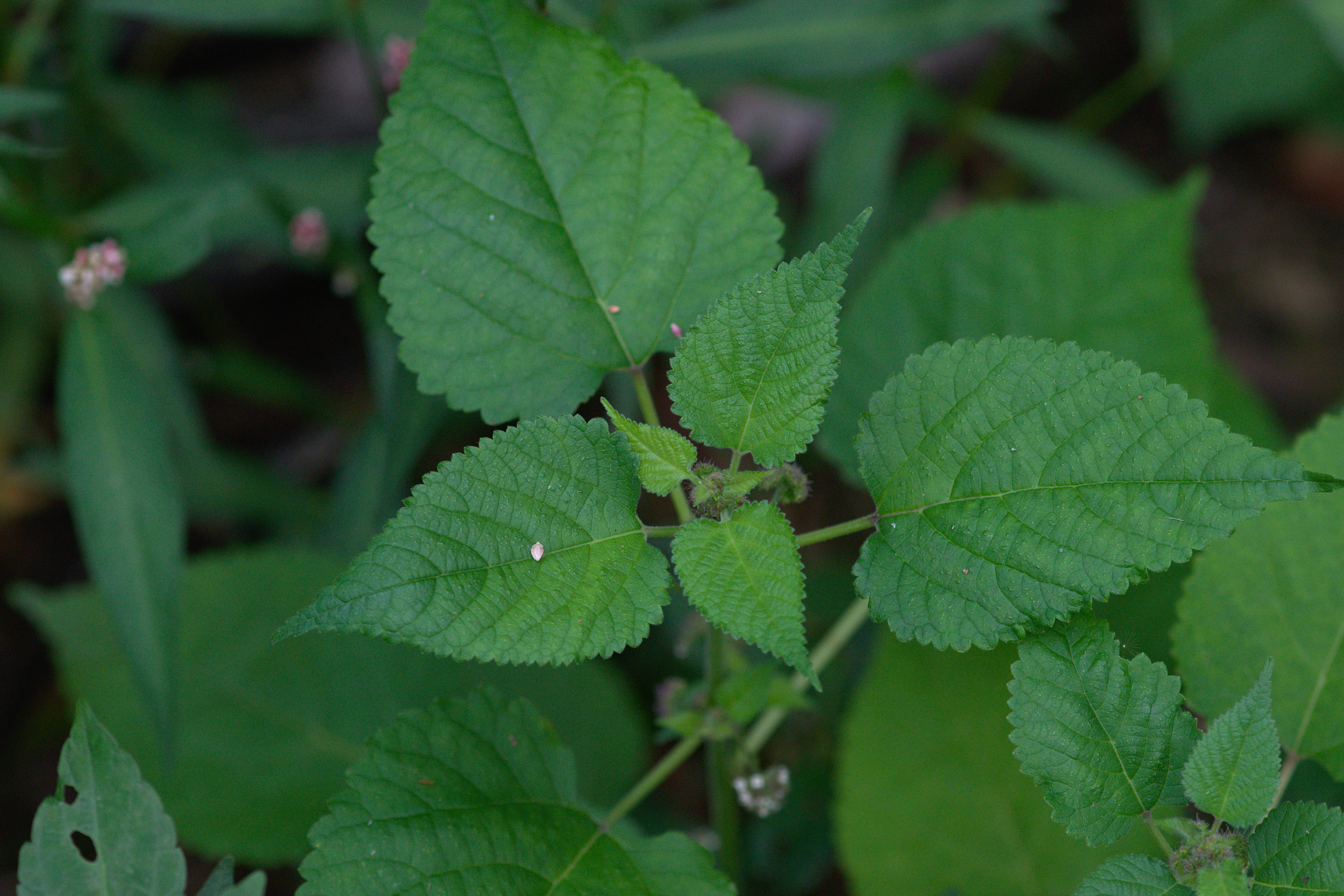
- Fatoua villosa

Scientific classification
- Kingdom: Plantae
- Clade: Tracheophytes
- Clade: Angiosperms
- Clade: Eudicots
- Clade: Rosids
- Order: Rosales
- Family: Moraceae
- Tribe: Dorstenieae
- Genus: Fatoua; Gaudich. (1830)

Species
- Fatoua madagascariensis Leandri; Fatoua pilosa Gaudich.; Fatoua villosa (Thunb.) Nakai

Synonyms
- Boehmeriopsis Kom. (1901)

= Fatoua =

Genus of flowering plants

Fatoua is a genus of flowering plants in the mulberry family (Moraceae). It includes 3 species of herbs.

== Species ==
- Fatoua madagascariensis Leandri – western Madagascar
- Fatoua pilosa Gaudich. – Taiwan, Philippines, Lesser Sunda Islands, New Guinea, and northern Australia
- Fatoua villosa (Thunb.) Nakai – Japan, Korea, Ryukyu Islands, Taiwan, southern China, Hainan, Vietnam, Thailand, Philippines, Java, Sulawesi, Maluku Islands, Lesser Sunda Islands, New Guinea, and northern Australia
