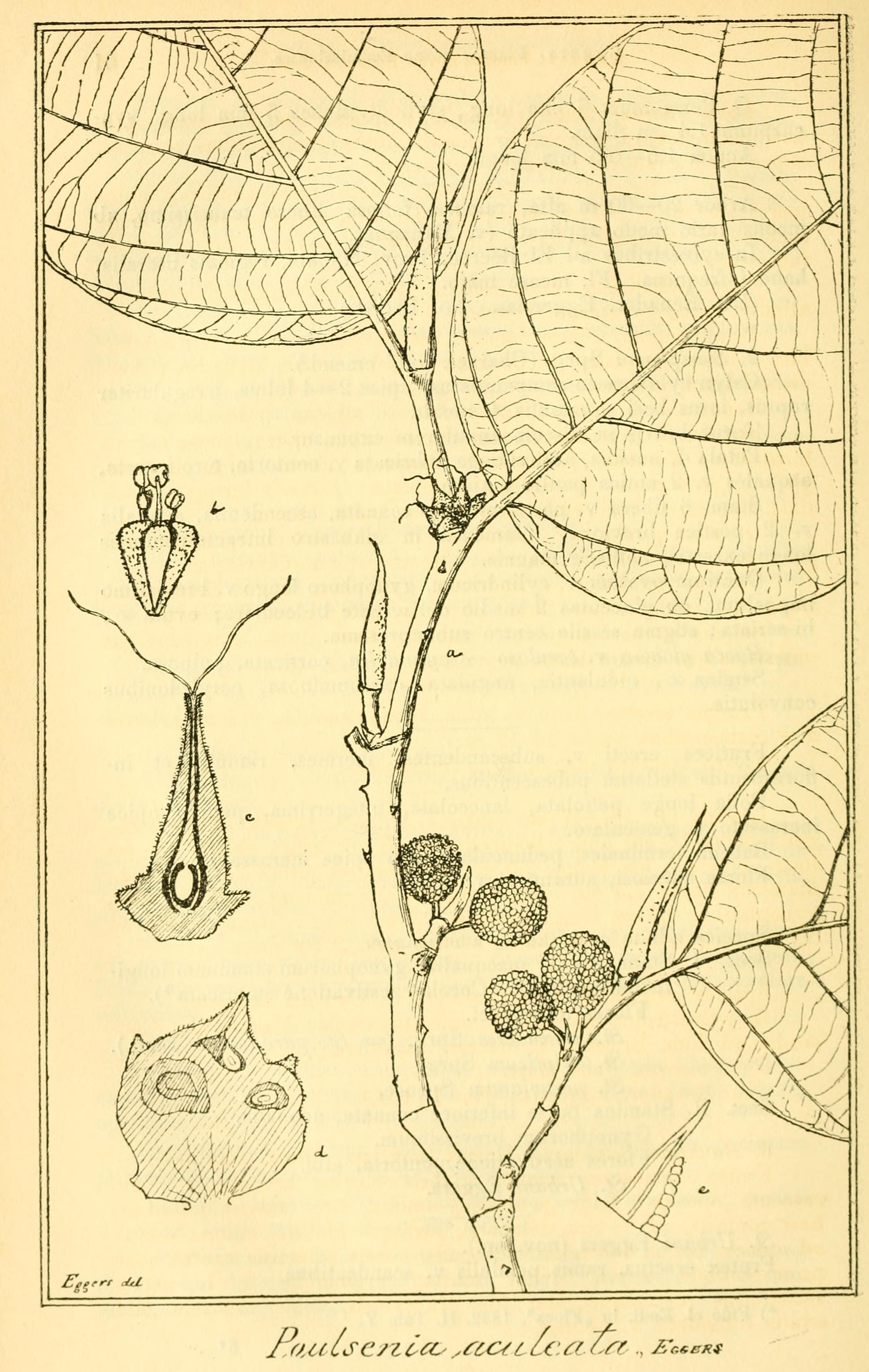

Conservation status
- Least Concern (IUCN 3.1)

Scientific classification
- Kingdom: Plantae
- Clade: Tracheophytes
- Clade: Angiosperms
- Clade: Eudicots
- Clade: Rosids
- Order: Rosales
- Family: Moraceae
- Tribe: Castilleae
- Genus: Poulsenia; Eggers
- Species: P. armata

Binomial name
- Poulsenia armata (Miq.) Standl.

Synonyms
- Coussapoa rekoi Standl.; Inophloeum armatum (Miq.) Pittier; Olmedia armata Miq.; Poulsenia aculeata Eggers

= Poulsenia =

Genus of trees

Poulsenia is a monotypic genus of trees in the family Moraceae. The only species is Poulsenia armata, native to rainforests from Mexico south to Bolivia.
