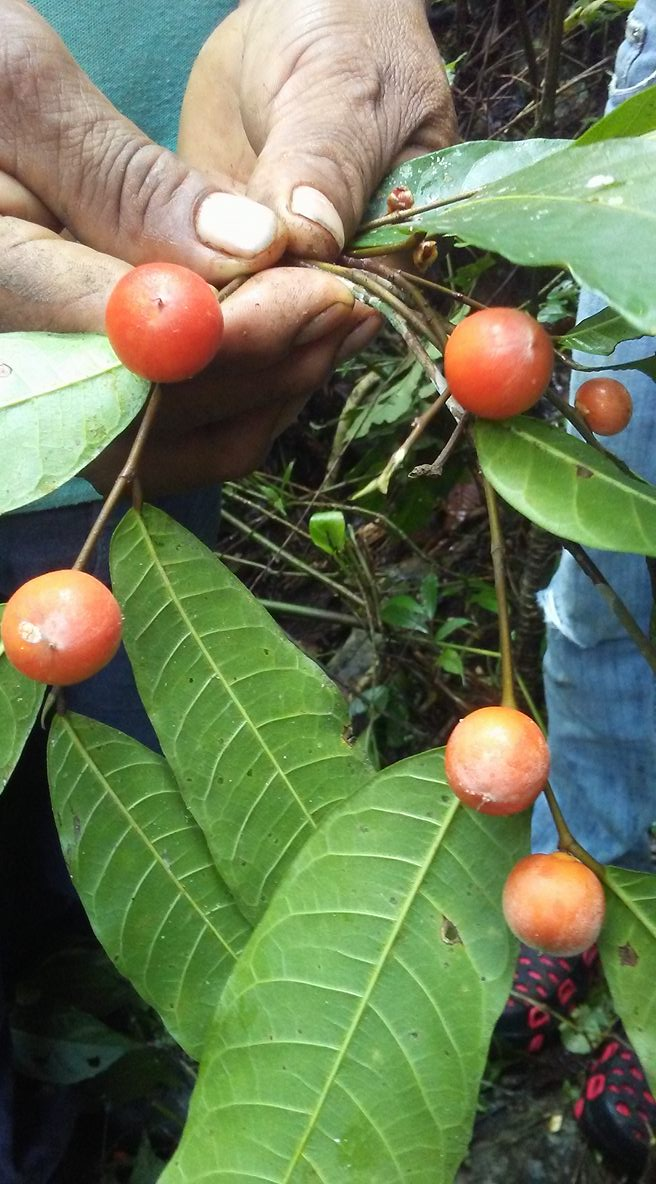
- Pseudolmedia glabrata

Scientific classification
- Kingdom: Plantae
- Clade: Tracheophytes
- Clade: Angiosperms
- Clade: Eudicots
- Clade: Rosids
- Order: Rosales
- Family: Moraceae
- Tribe: Castilleae
- Genus: Pseudolmedia; Trécul (1847)

Species
- 11; see text

Synonyms
- Olmediopsis H.Karst. (1862)

= Pseudolmedia =

Genus of flowering plants

Pseudolmedia is a flowering plant genus in the mulberry family (Moraceae). Species are found in southern Mexico, the Caribbean, and Meso- and South America. They are known in Latin America as lechechiva (approximately "goat's milk tree") and used for timber, construction wood, and sometimes in folk medicine.

== Species ==
11 species are accepted.

- Pseudolmedia boliviana C.C.Berg & Villav.
- Pseudolmedia gentryi C.C.Berg
- Pseudolmedia glabrata (Liebm.) C.C.Berg, called cherry
- Pseudolmedia hirtula Kuhlm.
- Pseudolmedia laevigata Trécul
- Pseudolmedia laevis (Ruiz & Pav.) J.F.Macbr. (synonym Pseudolmedia ferruginea (Poepp. & Endl.) Trécul (type) *)
- Pseudolmedia macrophylla Trécul
- Pseudolmedia manabiensis C.C.Berg
- Pseudolmedia mollis Standl.
- Pseudolmedia rigida (Klotzsch & H.Karst.) Cuatrec.
- Pseudolmedia spuria (Sw.) Griseb. (synonym Pseudolmedia havanensis Trécul (type) *)

* Note: Despite having been designated as types for this genus, The Plant List and Plants of the World Online consider P. ferruginea to be a synonym of P. laevis; and P. havanensis to be a synonym of P. spuria.
