= Utsetela =

Scientific classification
- Kingdom: Plantae
- Clade: Tracheophytes
- Clade: Angiosperms
- Clade: Eudicots
- Clade: Rosids
- Order: Rosales
- Family: Moraceae
- Tribe: Dorstenieae
- Genus: Utsetela; Pellegr. (1928)

Genus of flowering plants

Utsetela is a genus of flowering plants belonging to the family Moraceae.

Its native range is Democratic Republic of the Congo, Gabon, and Republic of the Congo.

Two species are accepted:

- Utsetela gabonensis Pellegr.
- Utsetela neglecta Jongkind
