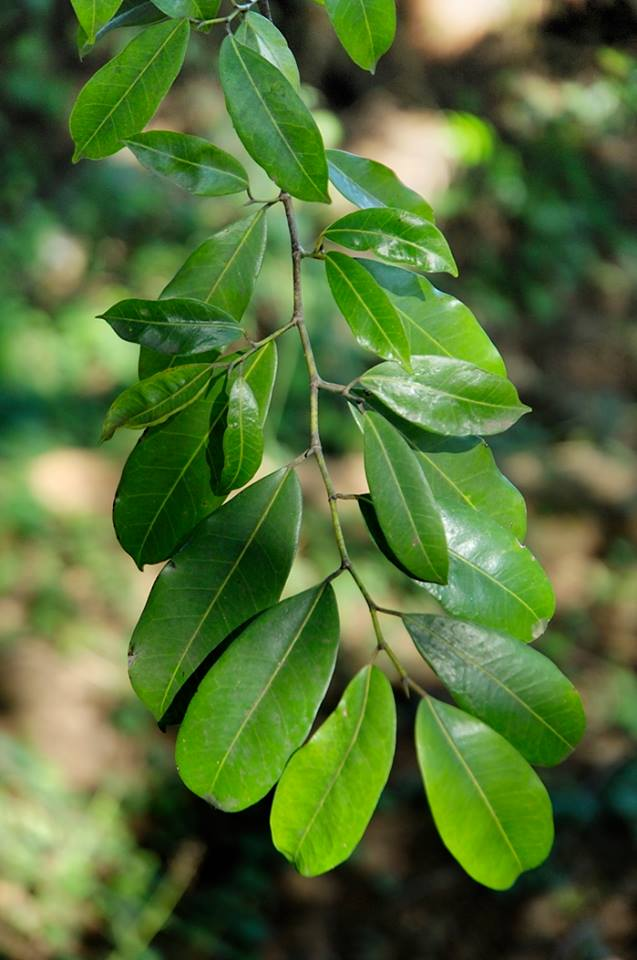
- T. madagascariense

Scientific classification
- Kingdom: Plantae
- Clade: Tracheophytes
- Clade: Angiosperms
- Clade: Eudicots
- Clade: Rosids
- Order: Rosales
- Family: Moraceae
- Tribe: Dorstenieae
- Genus: Trilepisium; Thouars (1806)

Species
- Trilepisium gymnandrum (Baker) J.Gerlach; Trilepisium madagascariense DC.

Synonyms
- Bosqueia Thouars ex Baill. (1863); Pontya A.Chev. (1909)

= Trilepisium =

Urnfigs

Genus of trees

Trilepisium, the urnfigs or false-figs, is a small Afrotropical genus of plants in family Moraceae. They grow to medium-sized or large trees that occur in evergreen and semi-deciduous forests, flooded forests or forest patches and often along rivers and streams, and at elevations of up to 2,000 m and over.

== Description ==
The bole may be 60 cm wide, and is often fluted at the base. The smooth, grey bark is very lenticellate and exudes a cream-coloured latex when damaged. The yellowish to pinkish slash turns purple-red as it dries. They usually branch high up to form a small and loosely pyramidal crown with drooping twigs. Stipules of terminal buds eventually leave annular scars.

The glossy and very dark elliptic leaves have a prominent driptip, and measure up to 14 cm long. They are glossy below, and have two small lobes at the base.

The flowers appear in spring and are arranged in a whitish to mauve puff. The puff is about 1 cm in diameter, and consists of staminate male flowers and pistillate female flowers, without perianths, which obscure the view of the receptacle. The flowers protrude from the open apex of an urn-shaped receptacle which is about 1.5 cm long.

The fig-like fruit, embedded in the fleshy receptacles, are some 2 cm long. They are ellipsoidal in shape and hold a nutlet each. Ripe fruit have the appearance of blue plums.

== Species ==
The two species are distinguished on floral characteristics:

- Trilepisium gymnandrum (Baker) J.Gerlach – Silhouette Island, Seychelles
- Trilepisium madagascariense DC. – African mainland, Madagascar and Annobón island

== Uses and species associations ==
The wood of T. madagascariense is suitable for furniture, and the sap yields a red dye. Its roasted seeds are eaten and it is sometimes cultivated. A methanol extract, fractions and isoliquiritigenin from T. madagascariense stem bark has been shown to possess antidiarrheal activities, and previously unknown trilepisflavan and trilepisuimic acid compounds were isolated from it in 2012.

Trilepisium madagascariense is a larval foodplant for the butterfly Cyrestis camillus sublineata. On the Seychelles the seeds are likely dispersed by frugivorous birds and fruit bats, but the pollinators are unknown.
