= Maillardia =

Scientific classification
- Kingdom: Plantae
- Clade: Tracheophytes
- Clade: Angiosperms
- Clade: Eudicots
- Clade: Rosids
- Order: Rosales
- Family: Moraceae
- Genus: Maillardia; Frapp. ex Duch.

Genus of flowering plants

Maillardia is a genus of plant in family Moraceae.

== Species ==
- Maillardia borbonica Duch.
- Maillardia montana Leandri
