= Hijmania =

Scientific classification
- Kingdom: Plantae
- Clade: Tracheophytes
- Clade: Angiosperms
- Clade: Eudicots
- Clade: Rosids
- Order: Rosales
- Family: Moraceae
- Genus: Hijmania; M.D.M.Vianna (2016)

Species
- 4; see text

Synonyms
- Maria M.D.M.Vianna (2013), nom. illeg.

Species of flowering plant

Hijmania is a genus of flowering plants in the mulberry family, Moraceae. It includes four species of shrubs and subshrubs native to tropical Africa, ranging from Guinea in the west through west and west-central Africa to Kenya and Tanzania in east Africa.

== Species ==
Four species are accepted.

- Hijmania alta (Engl.) M.D.M.Vianna – eastern Democratic Republic of the Congo to southeastern Kenya and eastern Tanzania
- Hijmania angusticornis (Engl.) M.D.M.Vianna – Cameroon
- Hijmania scaphigera (Bureau) M.D.M.Vianna – Central African Republic, Republic of the Congo, and Democratic Republic of the Congo
- Hijmania turbinata (Engl.) M.D.M.Vianna – Guinea to Ghana, and Nigeria to Republic of the Congo
