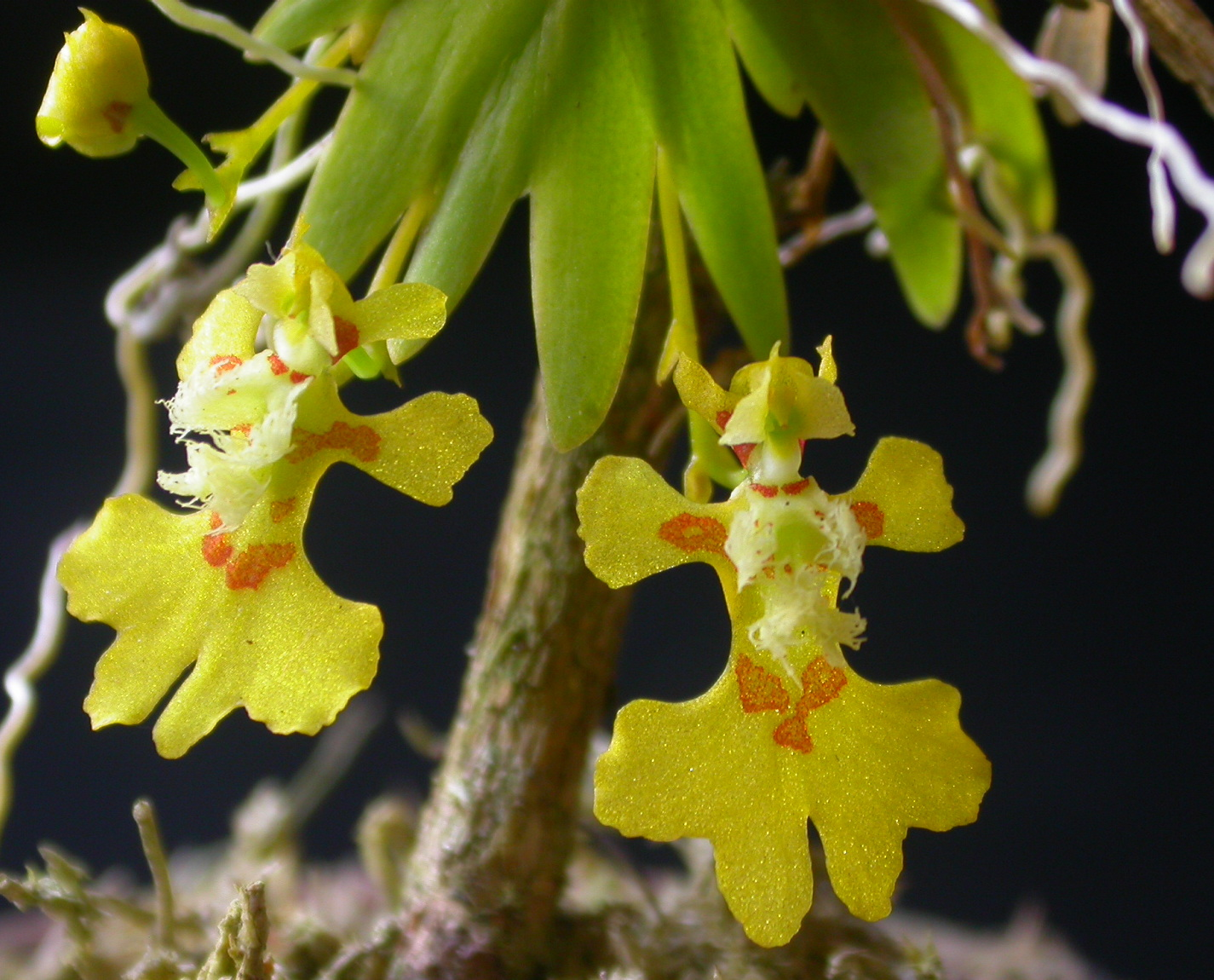
- Erycina glossomystax

Scientific classification
- Kingdom: Plantae
- Clade: Embryophytes
- Clade: Tracheophytes
- Clade: Spermatophytes
- Clade: Angiosperms
- Clade: Eudicots
- Order: Saxifragales
- Family: Saxifragaceae
- Genus: Saxifraga
- Section: Saxifraga sect. Cotylea; Tausch (1823)

Species
- Saxifraga rotundifolia Saxifraga taygetea

= Saxifraga sect. Cotylea =

Section of plants in genus Saxifraga

Saxifraga sect. Cotylea is a section in the genus Saxifraga.

The Saxifraga sect. Cotylea is typically considered to include two species: the Balkan S. taygetea and the widespread S. rotundifolia, found from the Pyrenees to the Caucasus.

Both species thrive in wet or shady habitats, such as montane forests and rocky areas. The Caucasian S. coriifolia, often treated as a subspecies or variety of S. rotundifolia, is identified as a sister taxon to the other two based on phylogenetic analyses and is suggested to merit species status.

The perennial, hemirosulate (partial rosette arrangement) plants of this section are characterized by reniform leaves with long petioles, distinctly superior ovaries, uniseriate multicellular hairs, and a unique pollen type.

Comparative analysis of matK gene sequences highlights distinct genetic features in Saxifraga sect. Cotylea. The presence of shared insertions and deletions (indels) in its DNA sequence aligns this section closely with other Saxifraga sections, such as Mesogyne, Porphyrion, and Cymbalaria. Notably, indel VII at position 1049 provides evidence of a shared evolutionary history within the genus.
