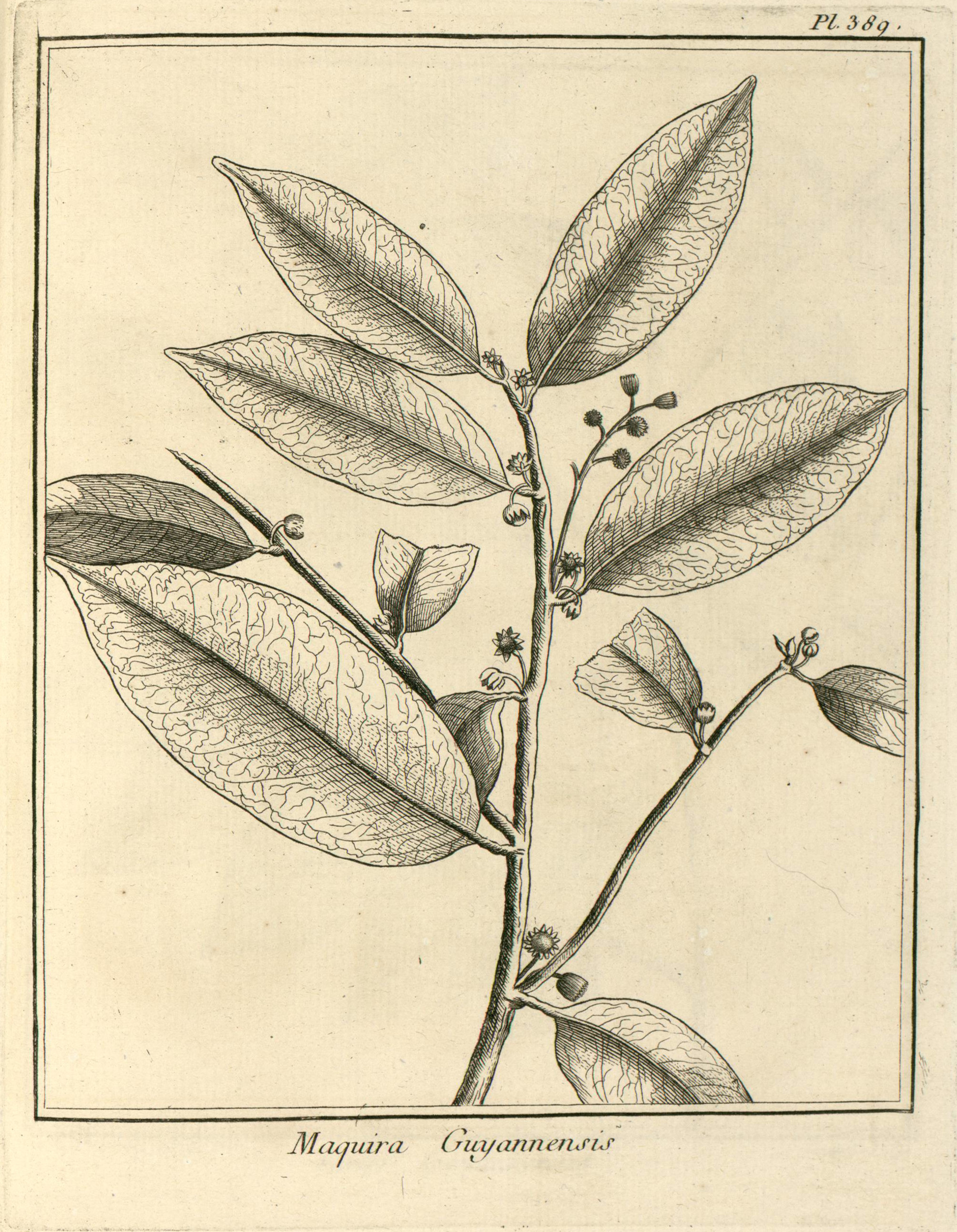
- Maquira guianensis botanical drawing, 1775

Scientific classification
- Kingdom: Plantae
- Clade: Embryophytes
- Clade: Tracheophytes
- Clade: Spermatophytes
- Clade: Angiosperms
- Clade: Eudicots
- Clade: Rosids
- Order: Rosales
- Family: Moraceae
- Tribe: Castilleae
- Genus: Maquira; Aubl.

Species
- 4 species, see text

Synonyms
- Olmedioperebea Ducke; Olmediophaena H.Karst.

= Maquira =

Genus of trees

Maquira is a genus of trees in the family Moraceae, native to South America.

== Taxonomy ==
The genus Maquira contains the following species:

- Maquira calophylla (Poepp. & Endl.) C.C.Berg
- Maquira coriacea (H.Karst.) C.C.Berg
- Maquira guianensis Aubl.
- Maquira sclerophylla (Ducke) C.C.Berg
