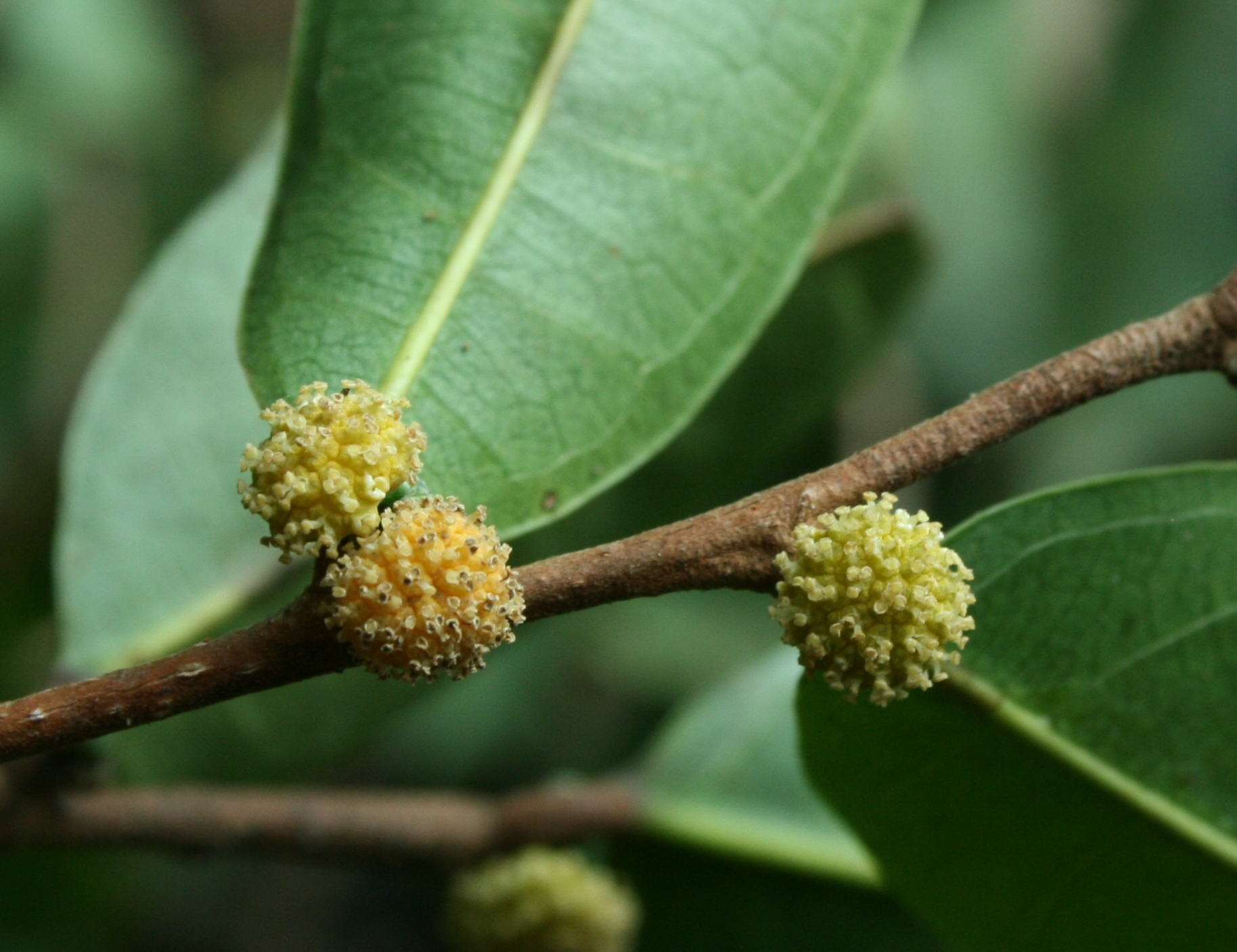
- Helicostylis elegans

Scientific classification
- Kingdom: Plantae
- Clade: Embryophytes
- Clade: Tracheophytes
- Clade: Spermatophytes
- Clade: Angiosperms
- Clade: Eudicots
- Clade: Rosids
- Order: Rosales
- Family: Moraceae
- Tribe: Castilleae
- Genus: Helicostylis; Trécul (1847)

Species
- 8; see text

Synonyms
- Greeneina Kuntze (1891)

= Helicostylis =

Genus of flowering plants

Helicostylis is a genus of flowering plants in the mulberry family, Moraceae. It includes eight species native to the tropical Americas, ranging from Costa Rica to Bolivia and southeastern Brazil.

== Species ==
Eight species are accepted.

- Helicostylis elegans (J.F.Macbr.) C.C.Berg
- Helicostylis heterotricha Ducke
- Helicostylis pedunculata Benoist
- Helicostylis salicifolia C.C.Berg
- Helicostylis scabra (J.F.Macbr.) C.C.Berg
- Helicostylis tomentosa (Poepp. & Endl.) Rusby
- Helicostylis tovarensis (Klotzsch & H.Karst.) C.C.Berg
- Helicostylis turbinata C.C.Berg
