= Sungei Tampines =

River in Singapore

Coordinates: 1°22′54″N 103°57′15″E

Sungei Tampines (IPA: /ˈsʊŋaɪ ˈtæmpəniːs/, Malay for Tampines River) is a river in Pasir Ris, Singapore. It is named for a type of tree that reportedly grew in the area, Streblus elongatus, commonly known as "tempinis" in Malay.

"Tampenus River" was first recorded in Lieutenant Philip Jackson’s 1828 map of Singapore.
