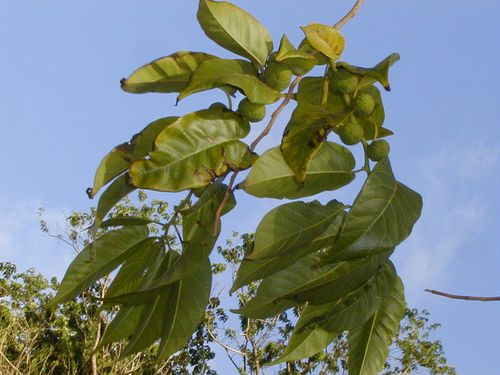
- Allaeanthus greveanus

Scientific classification
- Kingdom: Plantae
- Clade: Tracheophytes
- Clade: Angiosperms
- Clade: Eudicots
- Clade: Rosids
- Order: Rosales
- Family: Moraceae
- Genus: Allaeanthus; Thwaites

= Allaeanthus =

Genus of flowering plants

Allaeanthus is a genus of flowering plants belonging to the fig family Moraceae. Its native range is Madagascar and Comoros, to Nepal and southern China, mainland Southeast Asia and parts of Malesia.

== Species ==
As of June 2025, Plants of the World Online accepts the following four species:

- Allaeanthus greveanus (Baill.) Capuron
- Allaeanthus kurzii Hook.f.
- Allaeanthus luzonicus (Blanco) Fern.-Vill.
- Allaeanthus zeylanicus Thwaites
