= Scyphosyce =

Scientific classification
- Kingdom: Plantae
- Clade: Tracheophytes
- Clade: Angiosperms
- Clade: Eudicots
- Clade: Rosids
- Order: Rosales
- Family: Moraceae
- Genus: Scyphosyce; Baill. (1875)

Synonyms
- Cyathanthus Engl. (1897)

Genus of plants

Scyphosyce is a genus of flowering plants belonging to the family Moraceae.

Its native range is Nigeria and west-central Tropical Africa.

== Species ==
Three species are accepted.

- Scyphosyce gilletii De Wild.
- Scyphosyce manniana Baill.
- Scyphosyce pandurata Hutch.
