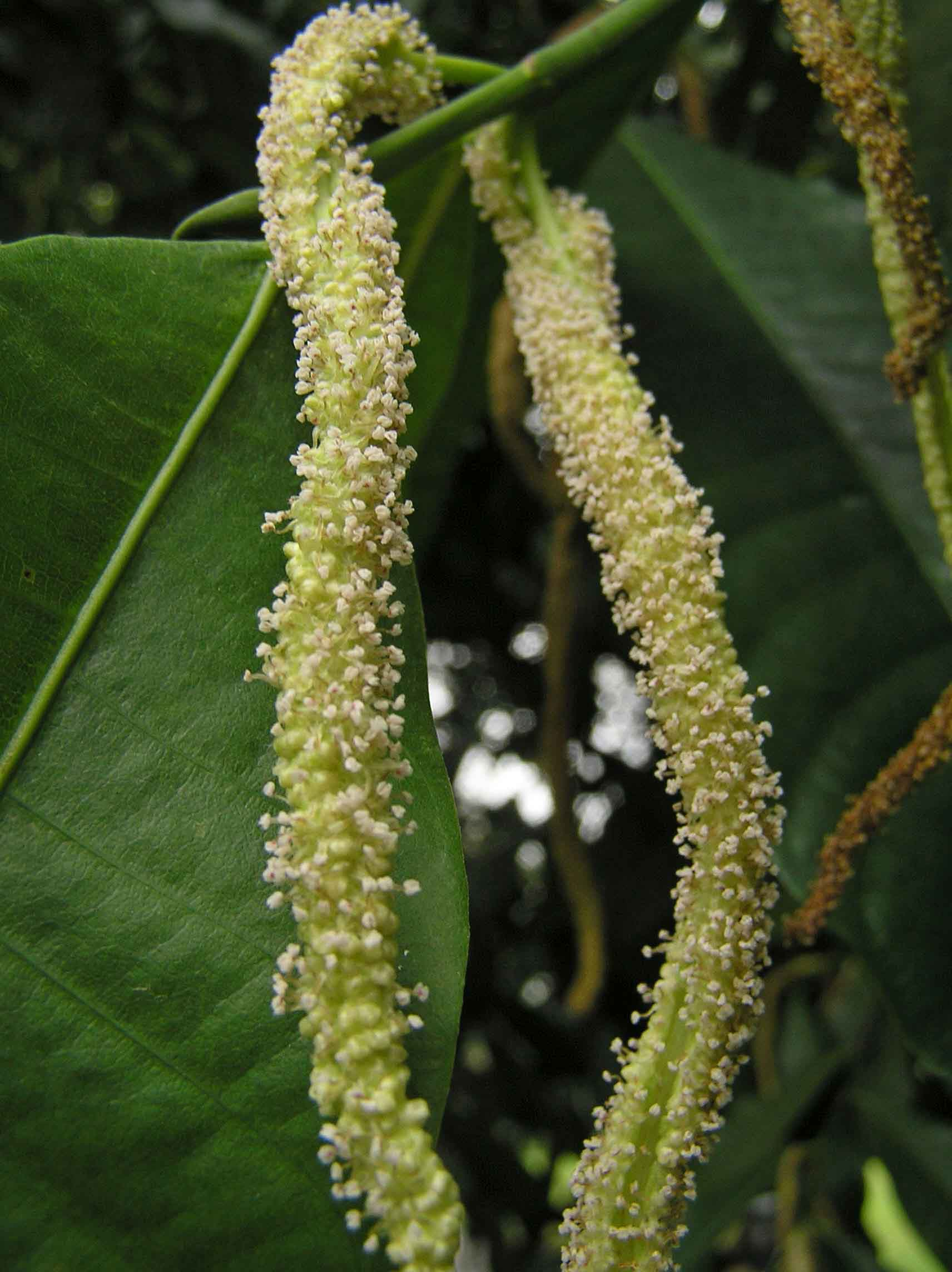
- In Singapore Botanic Gardens

Conservation status
- Least Concern (IUCN 3.1)

Scientific classification
- Kingdom: Plantae
- Clade: Tracheophytes
- Clade: Angiosperms
- Clade: Eudicots
- Clade: Rosids
- Order: Rosales
- Family: Moraceae
- Genus: Sloetia; Teijsm. & Binn. ex Kurz
- Species: S. elongata

Binomial name
- Sloetia elongata (Miq.) Koord.

Synonyms
- Artocarpus bifaria Wall. ex Miq. (1867); Artocarpus elongatus Miq. (1861); Artocarpus finlaysoniana Wall. (1831), not validly publ.; Morus bifaria Wall. ex Voigt (1845); Saccus elongatus (Miq.) Kuntze (1891); Streblus elongatus (Miq.) Corner (1962); Sloetia eusideroxylon Kurz (1865); Sloetia penangiana Oliv. (1886); Sloetia sideroxylon Teijsm. & Binn. ex Kurz (1863); Sloetia sideroxylon var. brevipes Bureau (1873); Sloetia wallichii King ex Hook.f. (1888)

= Sloetia =

Species of tree

Sloetia is a monotypic genus (i.e. a genus that contains just one species) of plants in the mulberry family, Moraceae. The sole species is Sloetia elongata, a tree native to southeastern Asia, ranging from the Nicobar Islands to Peninsular Malaysia, Sumatra, Borneo, and Sulawesi. It has been described a number of times by different botanists, and thus has several synonyms.

The plant produces white latex wherever it is cut. It is commonly known as "tampines tree" in Singapore, which is used as place names – Sungei Tampines river and Tampines Town are named after it. In Kuala Lumpur, the streets of a neighbourhood in Bangsar suburb are named, for example, Jalan Tempinis, Jalan Tempinis Kanan/Kiri and Lorong Tempinis Kiri 5.
