= Bosqueiopsis =

Scientific classification
- Kingdom: Plantae
- Clade: Tracheophytes
- Clade: Angiosperms
- Clade: Eudicots
- Clade: Rosids
- Order: Rosales
- Family: Moraceae
- Genus: Bosqueiopsis; De Wild. & T.Durand (1901)
- Species: B. gilletii

Binomial name
- Bosqueiopsis gilletii De Wild. & T.Durand (1901)

Synonyms
- Bosqueiopsis carvalhoana Engl. (1914); Bosqueiopsis lujae De Wild. (1907); Bosqueiopsis parvifolia Engl. (1914); Trymatococcus parvifolius (Engl.) Engl. (1915)

Genus of flowering plants

Bosqueiopsis gilletii is a species of flowering plant belonging to the family Moraceae. It is the sole species in genus Bosqueiopsis. It is native to tropical Africa, where it ranges from Republic of the Congo through Democratic Republic of the Congo to Tanzania and Mozambique.
