= Irina Grudzinskaya =

Russian botanist

Irina Aleksandrovna Grudzinskaya (1920–2012) was a Russian botanist who specialized in phanerogams, at one stage working in Cuba. Grudzinskaya trained at the Derkul Experimental Station of the Institute of Forestry, Academy of Science. She died in St Petersburg in 2011. In celebration of her 90th year, an article appeared in the Botanicheskii Zhurnal, which included a portrait and bibliography.

Grudzinskaya was born on 26 May 1920 to Kudzinskaya Blya, a teacher and Aleksandr Tukich Rudzinskiy, and attended schools in Khabarovsk and Ýngelüse. She attended Moscow State University and studied biology and by 1941, during the Second World War was working as a schoolteacher. Immediately after the end of the war in 1944 she returned to study of geobotany.

== Selected publications ==
- Grudzinskaja, I. A. The Ulmaceae of the Far East. CABI Bulletin, Wallingford, UK.
- Grudzinskaja, I. A. (1971). Novosti sistematiki vysshikh rastenii. Moscow & Leningrad.
- Borodina, A. E., Grubov, V. I., Grudzinskaja, I. A., Menitsky, J. L. (2005). Plants of Central Asia: Plant Collections from China and Mongolia: 9
