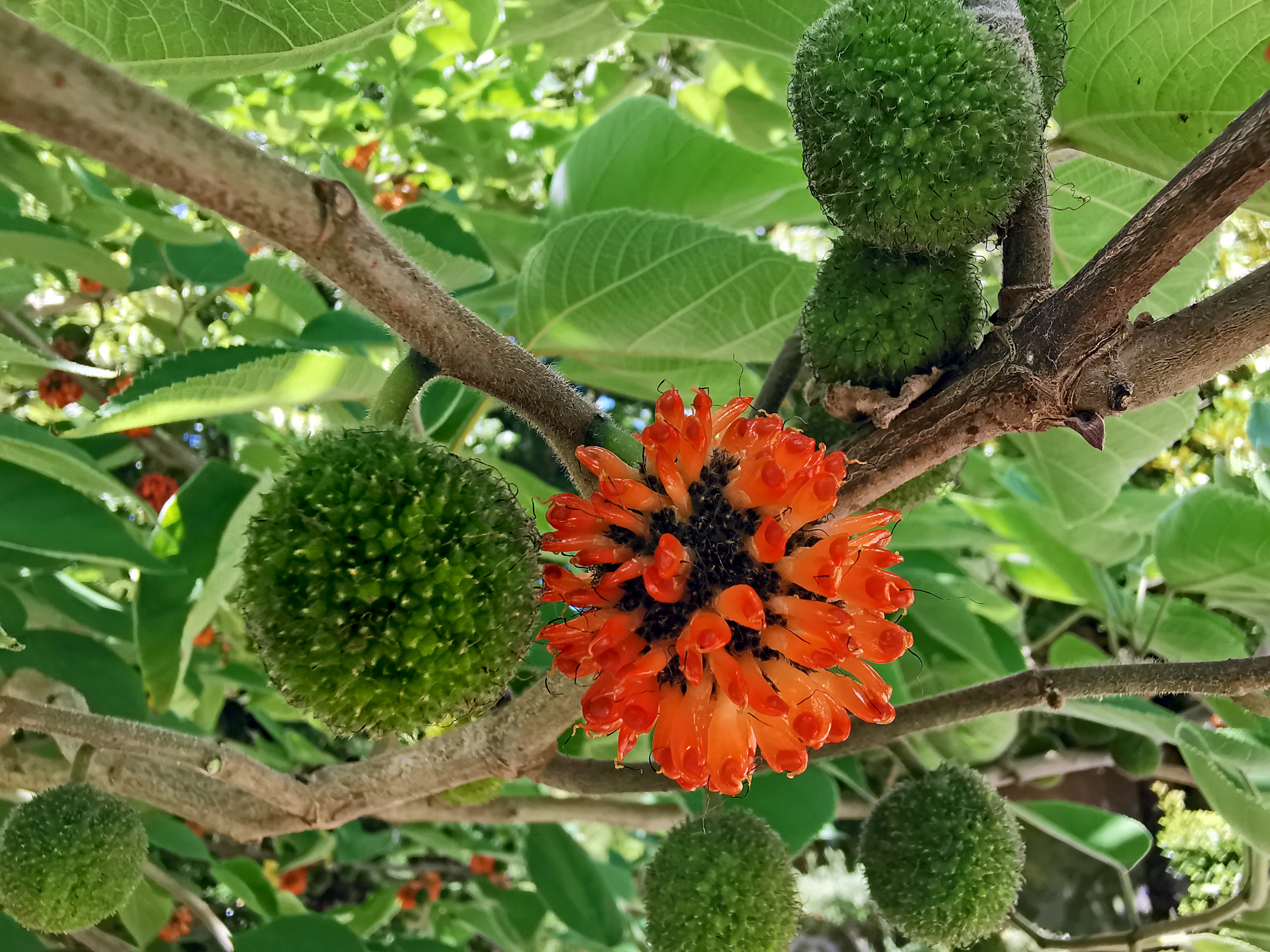
- Broussonetia papyrifera (paper mulberry)

Scientific classification
- Kingdom: Plantae
- Clade: Tracheophytes
- Clade: Angiosperms
- Clade: Eudicots
- Clade: Rosids
- Order: Rosales
- Family: Moraceae
- Tribe: Dorstenieae
- Genus: Broussonetia (L.) L'Hér. ex Vent. (1799)

Species
- Broussonetia harmandii Gagnep.; Broussonetia kaempferi Siebold; Broussonetia × kazinoki Siebold; Broussonetia monoica Hance; Broussonetia papyrifera (L.) L'Hér. ex Vent.

Synonyms
- Papyrius Lam. ex Cav. (1802); Smithiodendron Hu (1936); Stenochasma Miq. (1851)

= Broussonetia =

Genus of plants

Broussonetia is a genus of four species (including one hybrid species) of trees in the family Moraceae, native to eastern Asia. These four species have high-quality fiber which consist of more than 90% of cellulose. They are traditionally applied for various daily necessities in South Eastern Asia and papermaking in East Asia. It is named after Pierre Marie Auguste Broussonet, an illustrious French naturist.

One of these is the paper mulberry (Broussonetia papyrifera), whose bark fiber is used to make traditional paper in China, Korea, and Japan, and barkcloth among Austronesian cultures. This species has been widely introduced and has become invasive in some areas. Not only is paper mulberry used for paper making, but also other species are widely used in paper industry in those three countries' history. In fact, paper mulberry is not a major source of their traditional paper at least in Korea and Japan. Major material fibers of hanji (Korean paper) and washi (Japanese paper) come from Broussonetia × kazinoki. Broussonetia × kazinoki is known as only hybrid in Broussonetia genus between B. monoica and B. papyrifera.

== Species ==
Four species and one natural hybrid are accepted:

- Broussonetia harmandii Gagnep. – Laos
- Broussonetia kaempferi Siebold – south-central and southern Japan and the Ryukyu Islands
- Broussonetia × kazinoki Siebold – Japan, Korea, and the Ryukyu Islands
- Broussonetia monoica Hance – Eastern Himalayas to southern China, Vietnam, Hainan, Taiwan, the Ryukyu Islands, and Japan
- Broussonetia papyrifera (L.) L'Hér. ex Vent. – Indian subcontinent, Indochina, Tibet, China, and Korea

== Fossil record ==
Five fossil fruits of †Broussonetia pygmaea have been extracted from borehole samples of the Middle Miocene freshwater deposits in Nowy Sacz Basin, West Carpathians, Poland.
