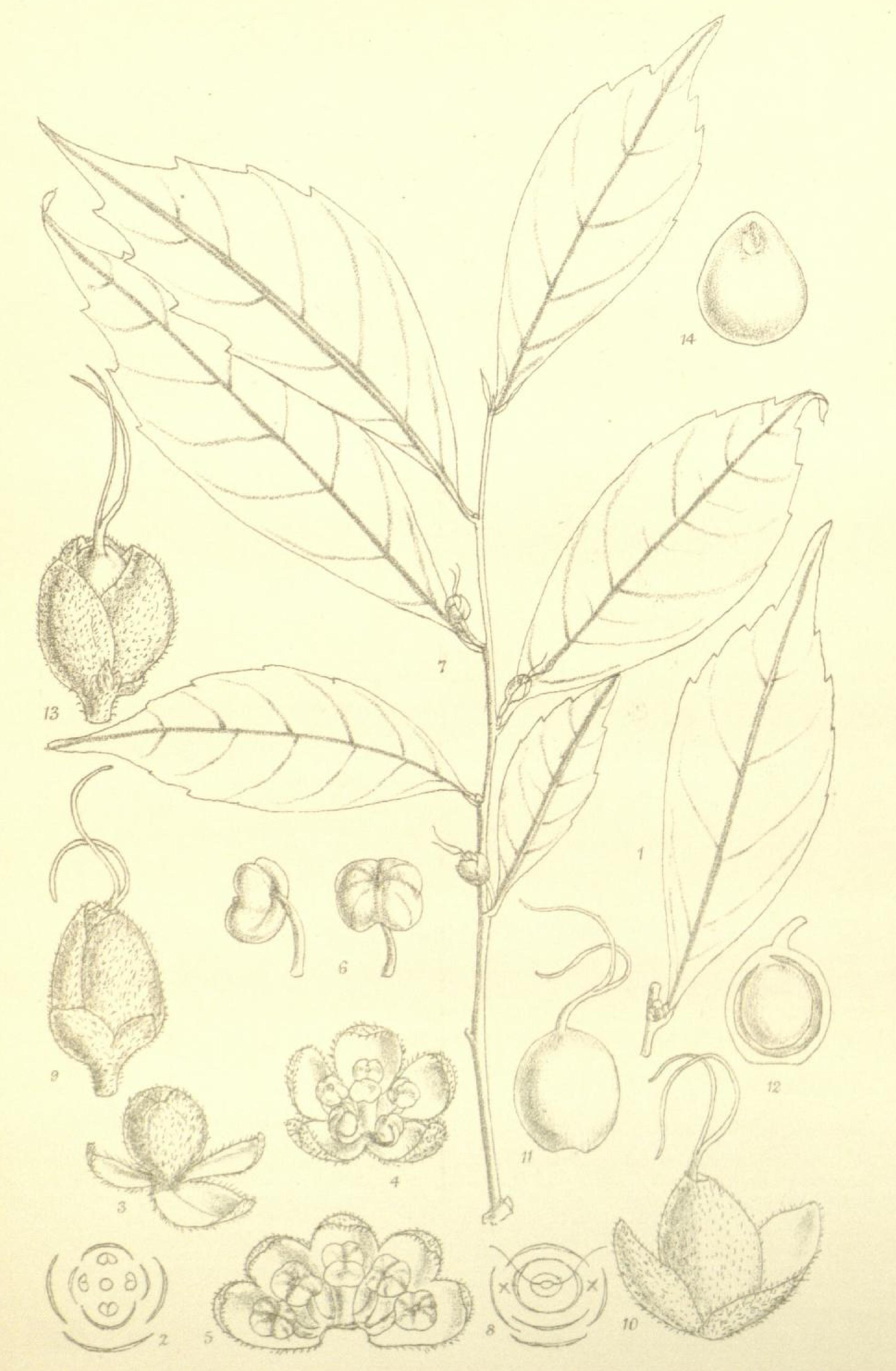
- Bleekrodea tonkinensis

Scientific classification
- Kingdom: Plantae
- Clade: Tracheophytes
- Clade: Angiosperms
- Clade: Eudicots
- Clade: Rosids
- Order: Rosales
- Family: Moraceae
- Genus: Bleekrodea; Blume (1852)

Synonyms
- Teonongia Stapf (1911)

= Bleekrodea =

Genus of flowering plants

Bleekrodea is a genus of flowering plants belonging to the family Moraceae.

Its native range is Madagascar and tropical Asia (Borneo, Peninsular Malaysia, Vietnam, Laos, Hainan, and southern China).

Species:

- Bleekrodea insignis Blume
- Bleekrodea madagascariensis Blume
- Bleekrodea tonkinensis Eberh. & Dubard
