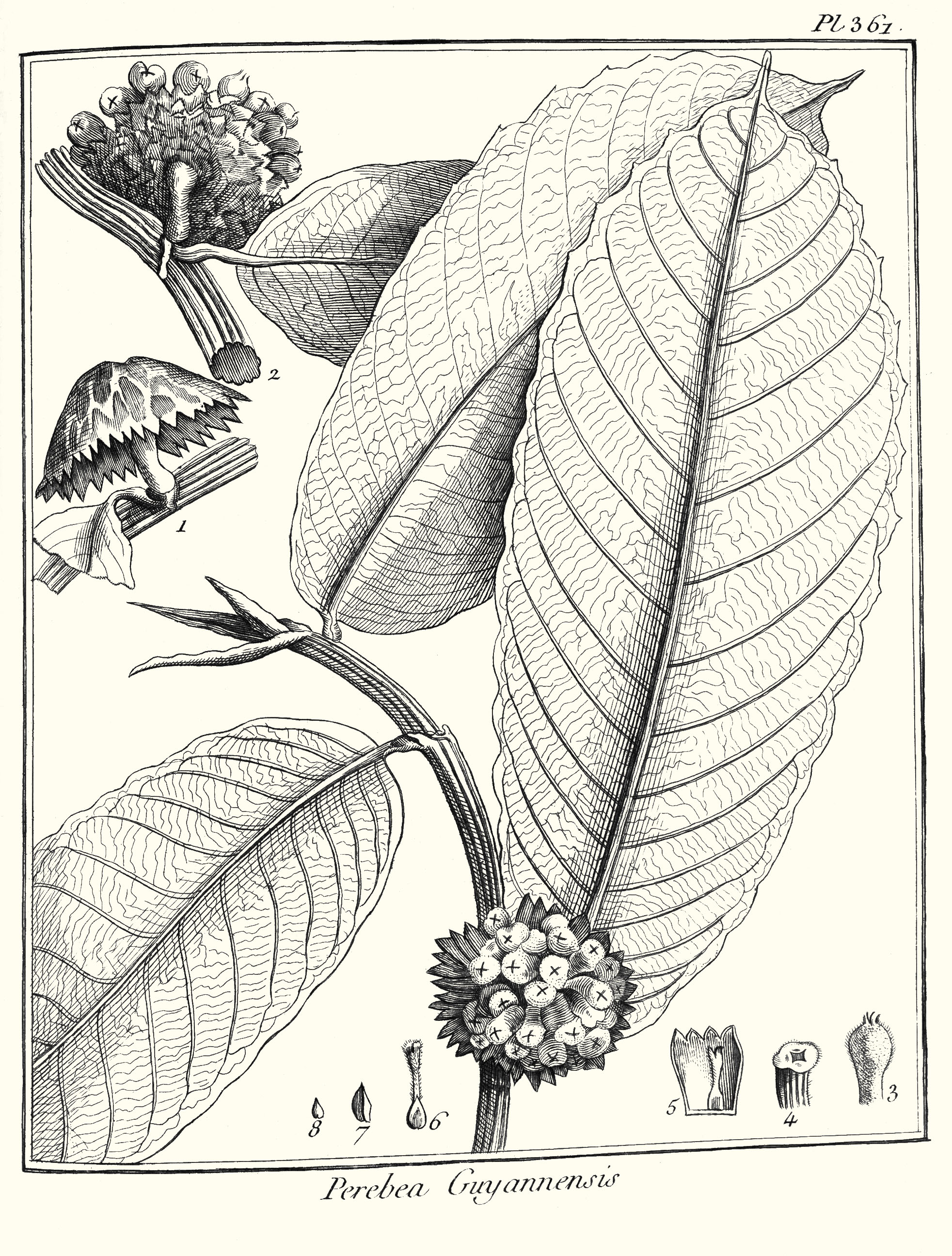
- Perebea guianensis in the original publication of Fusée-Aublet (1775)

Scientific classification
- Kingdom: Plantae
- Clade: Tracheophytes
- Clade: Angiosperms
- Clade: Eudicots
- Clade: Rosids
- Order: Rosales
- Family: Moraceae
- Genus: Perebea; Aubl.

Species
- 10; see text

Synonyms
- Noyera Trécul (1847)

= Perebea =

Genus of flowering plants

Perebea is a genus of flowering plants in the family Moraceae. It includes ten species native to the tropical Americas, ranging from Nicaragua to Bolivia and central Brazil.

== Species ==
Ten species are accepted.

- Perebea angustifolia (Poepp. & Endl.) C.C.Berg
- Perebea guianensis Aubl. (type)
- Perebea hispidula Standl.
- Perebea humilis C.C.Berg
- Perebea longepedunculata C.C.Berg
- Perebea mennegae C.C.Berg
- Perebea mollis (Poepp. & Endl.) Huber
- Perebea rubra (Trécul) C.C.Berg
  - Perebea rubra subsp. glabrifolia (Ducke) C.C.Berg (syn. Perebea glabrifolia (Ducke) C.C.Berg)
  - Perebea rubra subsp. rubra
- Perebea tessmannii Mildbr.
- Perebea xanthochyma H.Karst.
