= Antiaropsis =

Scientific classification
- Kingdom: Plantae
- Clade: Tracheophytes
- Clade: Angiosperms
- Clade: Eudicots
- Clade: Rosids
- Order: Rosales
- Family: Moraceae
- Genus: Antiaropsis; K.Schum.

Genus of flowering plants

Antiaropsis is a genus of flowering plants belonging to the family Moraceae. It is dioecious, with male and female flowers borne on separate plants.

Its native range is New Guinea.

Species:

- Antiaropsis decipiens K.Schum.
- Antiaropsis uniflora C.C.Berg
