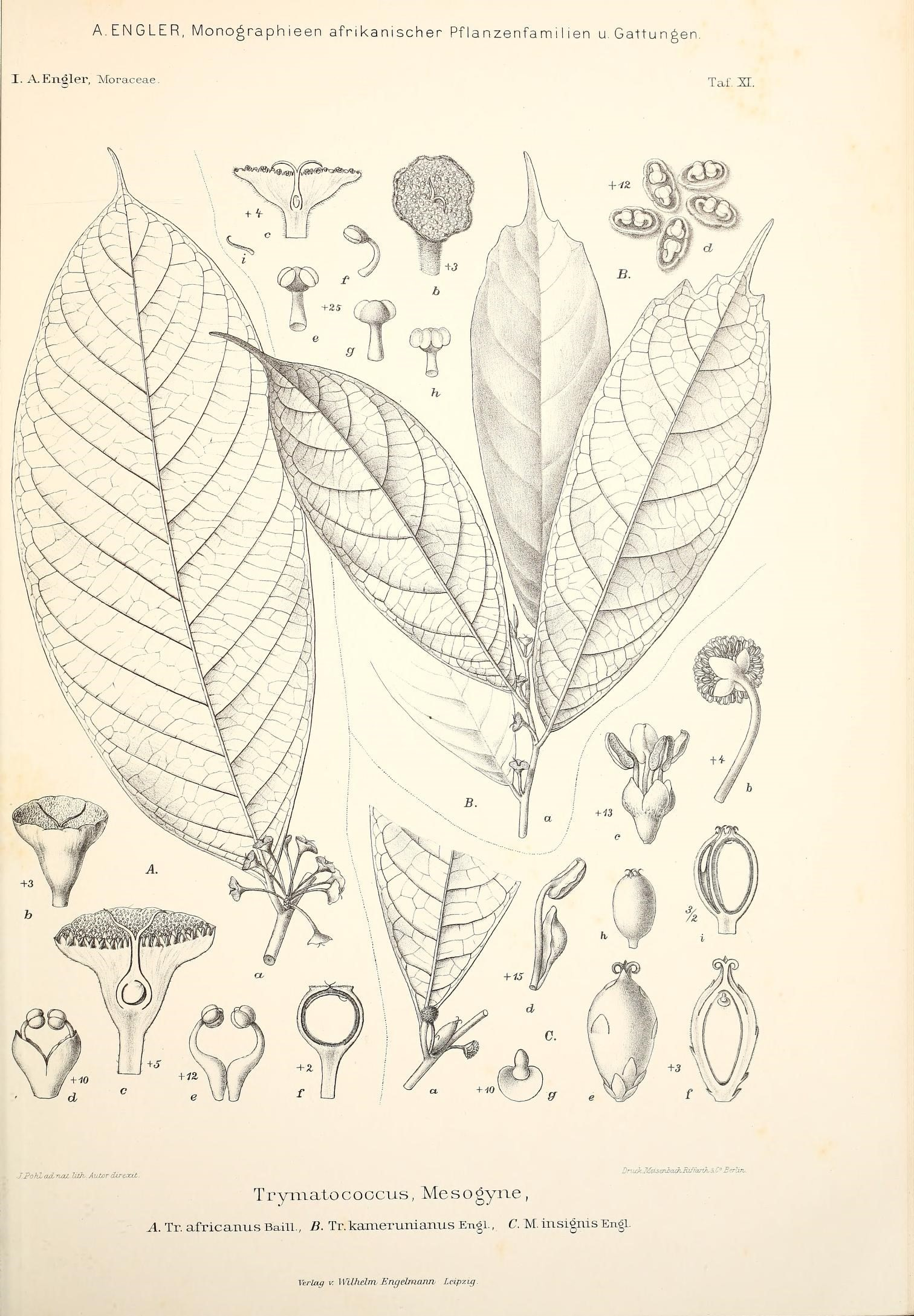

Conservation status
- Near Threatened (IUCN 3.1)

Scientific classification
- Kingdom: Plantae
- Clade: Tracheophytes
- Clade: Angiosperms
- Clade: Eudicots
- Clade: Rosids
- Order: Rosales
- Family: Moraceae
- Genus: Mesogyne; Engl. (1894)
- Species: M. insignis

Binomial name
- Mesogyne insignis Engl. (1894)

Synonyms
- Mesogyne henriquesii Engl. (1894)

= Mesogyne =

Genus of flowering plants

Mesogyne insignis is a species of flowering plants in the family Moraceae. It is the sole species in genus Mesogyne. It is a tree native to the island of São Tomé in the Gulf of Guinea and to eastern Tanzania.
