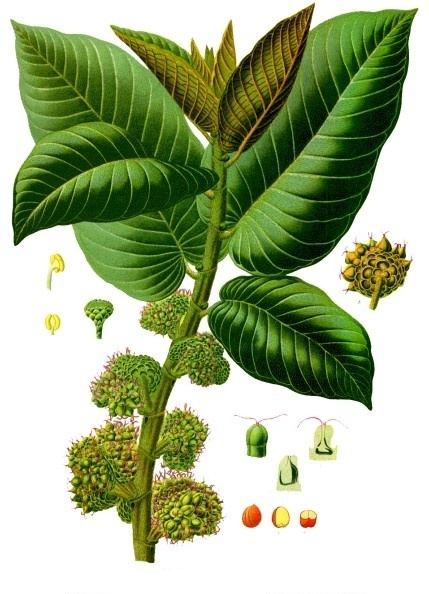
- Panama rubber tree (Castilla elastica)

Scientific classification
- Kingdom: Plantae
- Clade: Tracheophytes
- Clade: Angiosperms
- Clade: Eudicots
- Clade: Rosids
- Order: Rosales
- Family: Moraceae; Gaudich.

Genera
- 48; see text

= Moraceae =

Moraceae Temporal range: Cretaceous – Recent, 80–0 Ma

Family of flowering plants

Moraceae is a family of flowering plants comprising about 48 genera and over 1100 species, and is commonly known as the mulberry or fig family. Most are widespread in tropical and subtropical regions, less so in temperate climates; however, their distribution is cosmopolitan overall. The only common characteristics within the family are the presence of latex-producing glands in the leaves and stems, and milky sap in the soft tissues; but generally useful field characters include two carpels sometimes with one reduced, compound inconspicuous flowers, and compound fruit. The family includes well-known plants such as the common fig, breadfruit, jackfruit and mulberry. The flowers of Moraceae are often pseudanthia (reduced inflorescences).

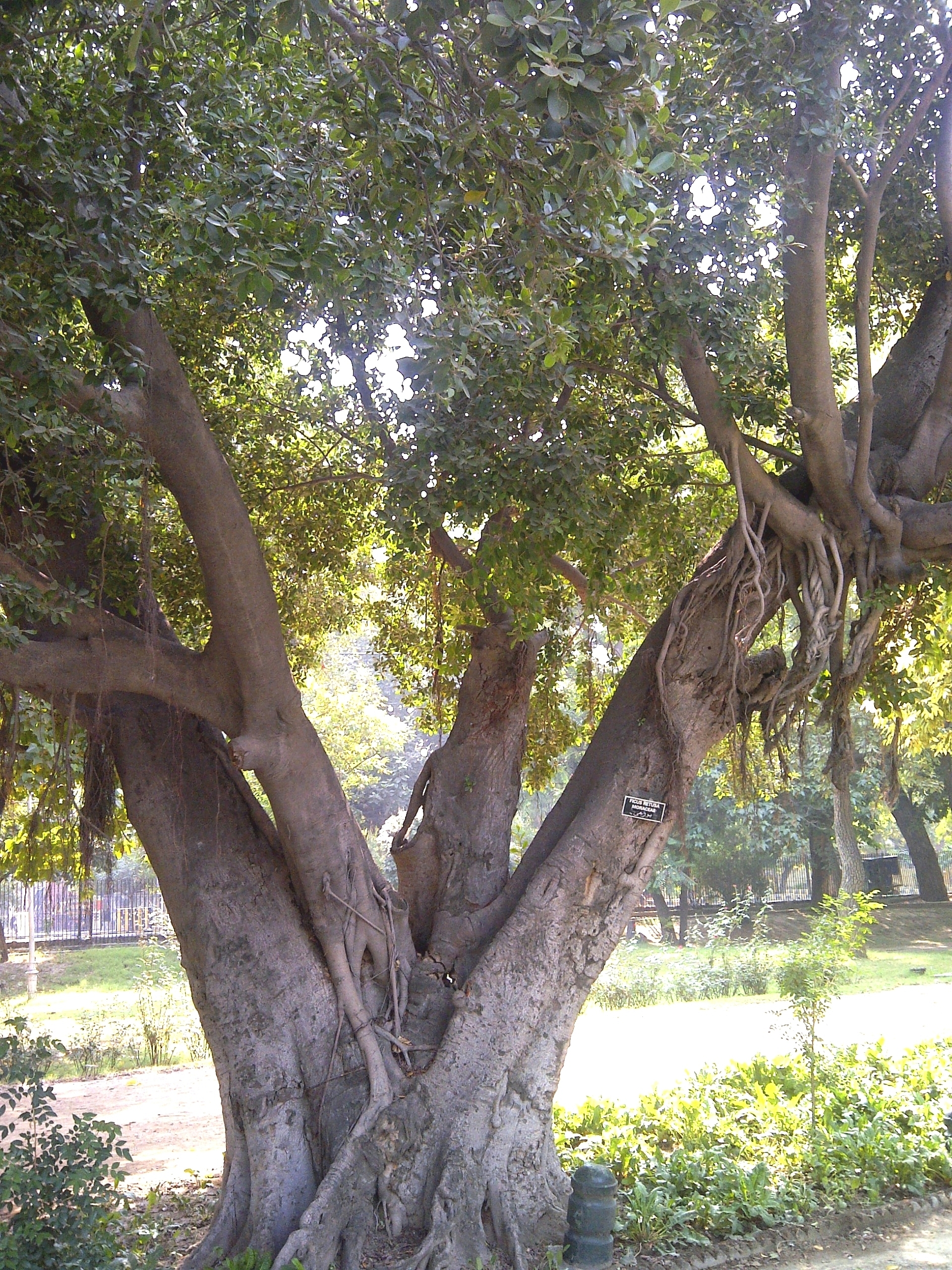
Ficus retusa (Moraceae) in Bagh-e-Jinnah, Lahore

== Description ==
=== Vegetative characteristics ===
The family varies from large trees like the Indian Banyan (Ficus benghalensis) which can cover 2 ha (4.9 acres) of ground, to Dorstenia barnimiana which is a small stemless, bulbous succulent 2–5 cm in diameter that produces a single peltate leaf on a 4–15 cm petiole. These two species have an approximately one billionfold difference in mass.

The leaves are much like the flowers when analyzing diversity. Usually the leaves are alternate (spiral or distichous), but rarely they can be opposite. The leaves can be singly attached to the stem or alternating, they may be lobed or unlobed, and can be evergreen or deciduous depending on the species in question. The mulberries can have numerous leaf shapes on the same tree; leaves can be both lobed and unlobed and appear very different, but coexist on the same plant; the most heavily lobed leaves are on vigorous young stems.

=== Generative characteristics ===
The individual flowers are often small, with single whorled or absent perianth. Most flowers have either petals or sepals, but not both, known as monochlamydeae, and have pistils and stamens in different flowers, known as diclinous. Except for Brosimum gaudichaudii and Castilla elastica, the perianth in all species of the Moraceae contain sepals. If the flower has an inflexed stamen, then pollen is released and distributed by wind dispersal; however, if the stamen is straight, then insect pollination is most likely to occur. Insect pollination occurs in Antiaropsis, Artocarpus, Castilla, Dorstenia, Ficus, and Mesogyne.

Plant species in the Moraceae are best known for their fruit. Overall, most species produce a fleshy fruit containing seeds. Examples include the breadfruit from Artocarpus altilis, the mulberry from Morus species, the fig from Ficus carica, and the jackfruit from Artocarpus heterophyllus.

== Taxonomy ==
Formerly included within the now defunct order Urticales, recent molecular studies have resulted in the family's placement within the Rosales in a clade called the urticalean rosids that also includes Ulmaceae, Celtidaceae, Cannabaceae, and Urticaceae. Cecropia, which has variously been placed in the Moraceae, Urticaceae, or their own family, Cecropiaceae, is now included in the Urticaceae.

Dioecy (having individuals with separate sexes) appears to be the primitive state in Moraceae. Monoecy has evolved independently at least four times within the family.

=== Phylogeny ===
Modern molecular phylogenetics suggest these relationships:

- - Urticaceae (outgroup)
  - Moraceae
    - - Artocarpeae
        - - Batocarpus
          - Clarisia
        - - Artocarpus
          - - Parartocarpus
            - Prainea
      - Moreae
        - Sorocea
        - - Bagassa
          - - - Milicia
              - Streblus
            - - Morus
              - Trophis
    - - Maclureae
        Maclura
      - - Dorstenieae
          - Fatoua
          - - - Broussonetia
              - Malaisia
            - - - Bleekrodea
                - Sloetia
              - Trilepisium
              - - - Utsetela
                  - Dorstenia
                - - Brosimum
                  - Trymatococcus
                  - Helianthostylis
        - - Ficeae
            Ficus
          - Castilleae
            - Antiaropsineae
              - Sparattosyce
              - Antiaropsis
            - Castillineae
              - - Antiaris
                - Mesogyne
              - - Naucleopsis
                - - Perebea
                  - Pseudolmedia
                  - - Maquira
                    - - Helicostylis
                      - - Poulsenia
                        - Castilla

=== Tribes and genera ===
Moraceae comprises 48 genera in seven tribes.

- Artocarpeae Lam. & DC.
  - Artocarpus J.R.Forst. & G.Forst. (73 spp.)
  - Batocarpus H.Karst. (3 spp.)
  - Clarisia Ruiz & Pav. (4 spp.)
- Chlorophoreae (syn. Maclureae W.L. Clement & Weiblen)
  - Maclura Nutt. (13 spp.)
- Parartocarpeae
  - Hullettia King ex Hook.f. (2 spp.)
  - Parartocarpus Baill. (2 spp.)
  - Pseudostreblus Bureau (1 sp.)
- Olmedieae Trécul (syn. Castilleae)
  - Antiaris Lesch. (1 sp.)
  - Antiaropsis K.Schum. (2 spp.)
  - Castilla Cerv. (3 spp.)
  - Helicostylis Trécul (8 spp.)
  - Maquira Aubl. (4 spp.)
  - Mesogyne Engl. (1 sp.)
  - Naucleopsis Miq. (25 spp.)
  - Olmedia Ruiz & Pav. (1 sp.)
  - Perebea Aubl. (10 spp.)
  - Poulsenia Eggers (1 sp.)
  - Pseudolmedia Trécul (11 spp.)
  - Sparattosyce Bur. (2 spp.)
  - Streblus Lour. (5 spp.)
- Dorstenieae Dumort.
  - Bleekrodea Blume (3 spp.)
  - Bosqueiopsis De Wild. & T.Durand (1 sp.)
  - Brosimum Sw. (19 spp.)
  - Broussonetia L'Hér. ex Vent. (4 spp.)
  - Dorstenia L. (122 spp.)
  - Fatoua Gaudich. (3 spp.)
  - Malaisia Blanco (1 sp.)
  - Scyphosyce Baill. (3 spp.)
  - Sloetia Teijsm. & Binn. ex Kurz (1 sp.)
  - Sloetiopsis Engl. (1 sp.)
  - Trilepisium Thouars (2 sp.)
  - Utsetela Pellegr. (2 sp.)
- Ficeae Gaudich.
  - Ficus L. (880 spp.)
- Moreae Dumort.
  - Afromorus E.M.Gardner (1 sp.)
  - Ampalis Bojer (2 spp.)
  - Bagassa Aubl. (1 sp.)
  - Maillardia Frapp. ex Duch. (2 spp.)
  - Milicia Sim (2 spp.)
  - Morus L. (17 spp.)
  - Paratrophis Blume (12 spp.)
  - Sorocea A.St.-Hil. (22 spp.)
  - Taxotrophis Blume (6 spp.)
  - Trophis P.Browne (5 spp.)

Other genera accepted by Plants of the World Online as of April 2024:

- Allaeanthus Thwaites (4 spp.)
- Calaunia Gudzins. (1 sp.)
- Hijmania M.D.M.Vianna (4 spp.)
- Prainea King ex Hook.f. (2 spp.)
- Treculia Decne. ex Trécul (5 spp.)

=== Fossil genera and species ===
In addition to the living species, a number of fossil genera have been ascribed to the family:

- †Aginoxylon Dupéron
- Aginoxylon moroides Dupéron
- †Artocarpidium Unger
- †Artocarpoides Saporta
- †Arthmiocarpus Delevoryas
- †Artocarpoxylon Prakash & Lalitha
- †Becktonia M. Chandler
  - †Becktonia hantonensis M. Chandler
- †Cornerocarpon Grote
  - †Cornerocarpon copiosum Grote
- †Coussapoites Pons
  - †Coussapoites veracruzianus Pons
- †Cudranioxylon Dupéron-Laudoueneix
  - †Cudranioxylon engolismense Dupéron-Laudoueneix
- †Ficofolium Peters
  - †Ficofolium weylandii Peters
- †Ficonium Ettingshausen
  - †Ficonium nitidum Paterson
  - †Ficonium silesiacum (Velenovský) Halamski & J. Kvaček
  - †Ficonium solanderi Ettingshausen
- †Milicioxylon Shukla, Mehrotra, & Guleria
  - †Milicioxylon kachchhense Shukla, Mehrotra, & Guleria
- †Moraceoipollenites Zheng
- †Moricites Krüger
- †Moroidea M. Chandler
  - †Moroidea baltica Dorofeev
  - †Moroidea caucasica Dorofeev
  - †Moroidea cretacea Knobloch & Mai
  - †Moroidea hordwellensis M. Chandler
  - †Moroidea reticulata Dorofeev
  - †Moroidea tymensis Dorofeev
- †Moroxylon Selmeier
- †Myrianthoxylon Koeniguer
  - Myrianthoxylon chaloneri Koeniguer
- †Ovicarpum M. Chandler
- †Palaeokalopanax Fotjanova
  - †Palaeokalopanax kamtschaticus Fotjanova
  - †Palaeokalopanax vollosovitschii Chelebaeva
- †Paleoficus Biswas
- †Protoficus Saporta
  - †Protoficus crenulata Saporta
  - †Protoficus crispans Langeron
  - †Protoficus dentatus Langeron
  - †Protoficus insignis Saporta
  - †Protoficus lacera Saporta
  - †Protoficus nervosa Newberry
  - †Protoficus saportae Principi
  - †Protoficus sezannensis (Watelet) Saporta
- †Soroceaxylon Franco
  - Soroceaxylon entrerriense Franco
- †Ungerites Schleiden (syn Ficoxylon)
  - †Ungerites tropicus Schleiden
- †Welkoetoxylon Boonchai, Manchester, & Wheeler
  - †Welkoetoxylon multiseriatum Boonchai, Manchester, & Wheeler

== Evolution ==
While the fossil record of Moraceae goes back to the late Cretaceous, molecular clock estimates suggest that the family had begun to diversify by the mid-Cretaceous, with some major clades emerging during the Tertiary period.

== Distribution ==
Moraceae can be found throughout the warm temperate to tropical world with a near-cosmopolitan distribution, but mostly absent north of around 45°N latitude, and also absent from most of the Sahara and Arabian Deserts. The majority of species originate in the Old World tropics, particularly in Asia and the Pacific islands.

== See also ==
- Barkcloth
