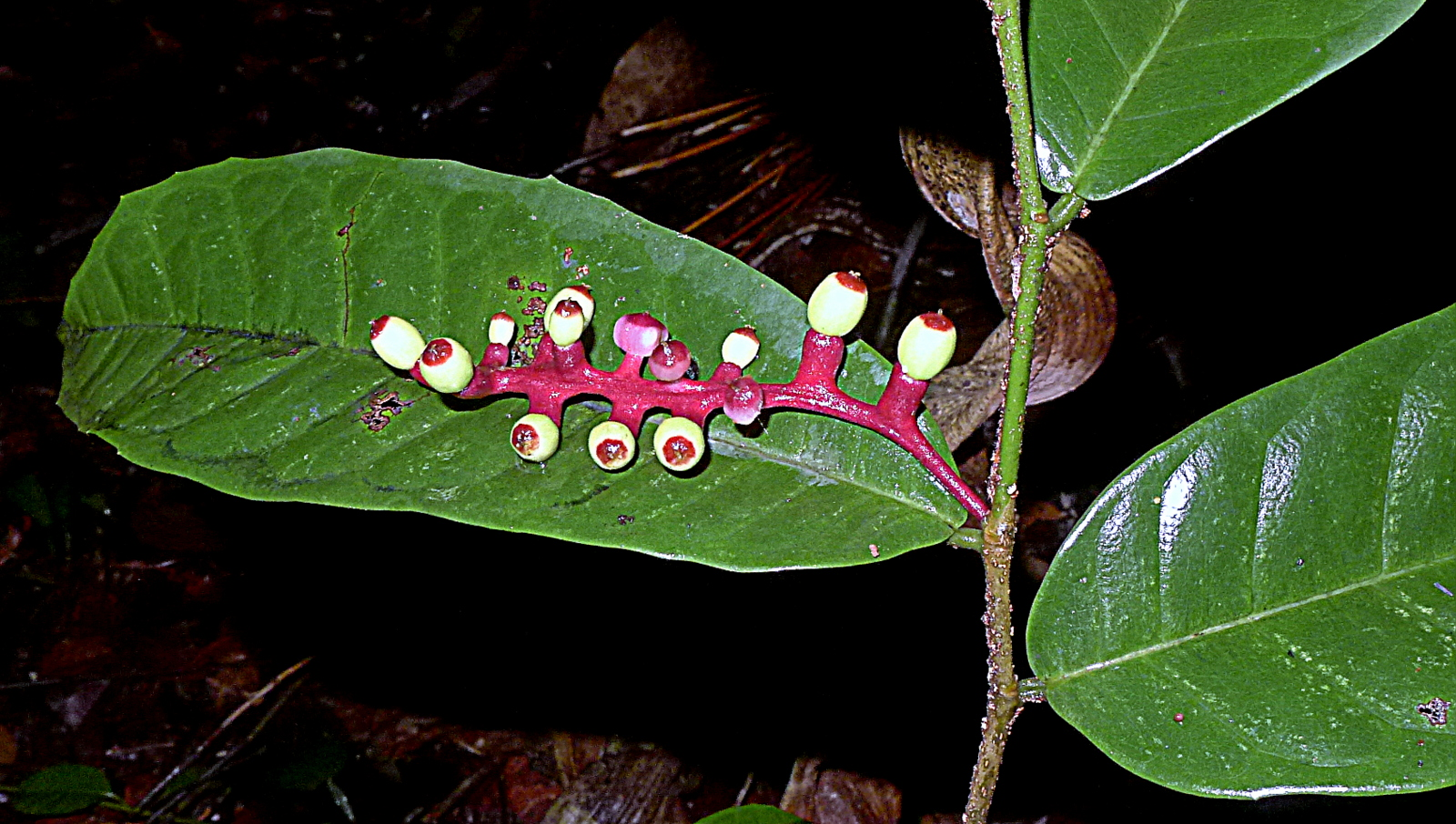
- Sorocea hilarii

Scientific classification
- Kingdom: Plantae
- Clade: Tracheophytes
- Clade: Angiosperms
- Clade: Eudicots
- Clade: Rosids
- Order: Rosales
- Family: Moraceae
- Tribe: Moreae
- Genus: Sorocea; A.St.-Hil. (1821)

Species
- 22; see text

Synonyms
- Paraclarisia Ducke (1939); Pseudosorocea Baill. (1875); Trophisomia Rojas (1914)

= Sorocea =

Genus of plants

Sorocea is a Neotropical genus of woody plants in the family Moraceae. Its distribution ranges from Chiapas to southern Brazil. It is placed within the tribe Moreae, and is closely related to the monotypic Bagassa.

== Species list ==
According to Kew, there are currently 22 accepted species:

- Sorocea affinis Hemsl.
- Sorocea angustifolia Al.Santos & Romaniuc
- Sorocea bonplandii (Baill.) W.C.Burger, Lanj. & de Boer
- Sorocea briquetii J.F.Macbr.
- Sorocea carautana M.D.M.Vianna, Carrijo & Romaniuc
- Sorocea duckei W.C.Burger
- Sorocea ganevii R.M.Castro
- Sorocea guilleminiana Gaudich.
- Sorocea hilarii Gaudich.
- Sorocea jaramilloi C.C.Berg
- Sorocea jureiana Romaniuc
- Sorocea klotzschiana Baill.
- Sorocea longipedicellata A.F.P.Machado, M.D.M.Vianna & Romaniuc
- Sorocea muriculata Miq.
- Sorocea pubivena Hemsl.
- Sorocea racemosa Gaudich.
- Sorocea ruminata C.C.Berg
- Sorocea sarcocarpa Lanj. & Wess.Boer
- Sorocea sprucei (Baill.) J.F.Macbr.
- Sorocea steinbachii C.C.Berg
- Sorocea subumbellata (C.C.Berg) Cornejo
- Sorocea trophoides W.C.Burger
