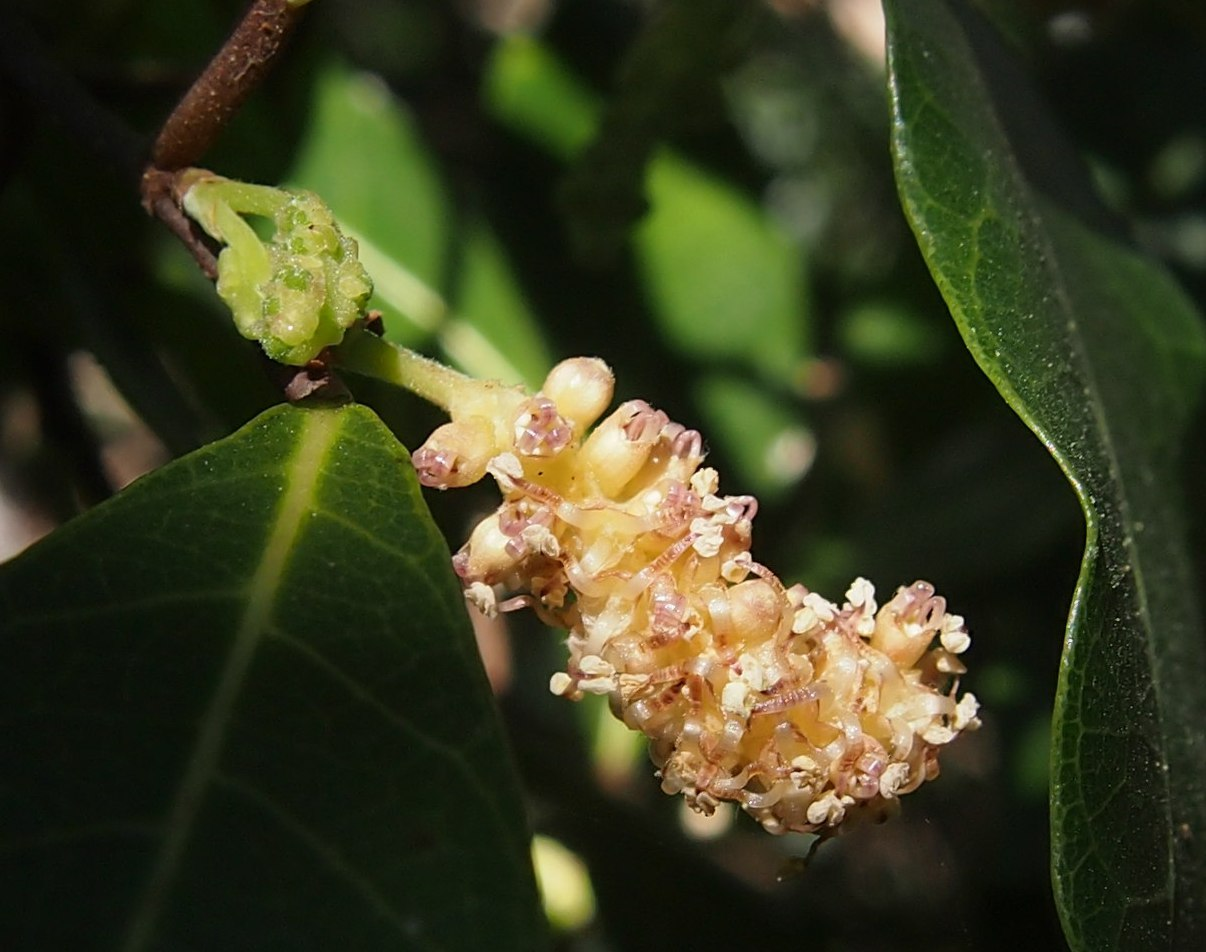
- Flower spike and leaves

Scientific classification
- Kingdom: Plantae
- Clade: Embryophytes
- Clade: Tracheophytes
- Clade: Spermatophytes
- Clade: Angiosperms
- Clade: Eudicots
- Clade: Rosids
- Order: Rosales
- Family: Moraceae
- Tribe: Dorstenieae
- Genus: Malaisia; Blanco
- Species: M. scandens

Binomial name
- Malaisia scandens (Lour.) Planch.

Synonyms
- 34 synonyms: for T. scandens; Alchornea scandens (Lour.) Müll.Arg.; Caturus scandens Lour.; Malaisia tortuosa var. scandens (Lour.) Bureau, nom. superfl.; Trophis scandens (Lour.) Hook. & Arn.; for subsp. megacarpa; Trophis scandens subsp. megacarpa (P.S.Green) P.S.Green; for subsp. scandens; Caturus acuminatus (Planch.) Seem.; Caturus cunninghamii Seem.; Caturus deplanchei Seem.; Caturus fagifolius Seem.; Caturus pelagicus Seem.; Caturus tortuosa (Blanco) Seem.; Caturus viridescens (Planch.) Seem.; Cephalotrophis javanica Blume; Cephalotrophis puberula Miq.; Dumartroya fagifolia Gaudich.; Maclura javanica (Blume) Miq.; Malaisia aculeata Blume; Malaisia acuminata Planch.; Malaisia blancoi Elmer; Malaisia cunninghamii Planch.; Malaisia puberula (Miq.) Bureau; Malaisia scandens var. rolfei K.Schum.; Malaisia spinosa Blume; Malaisia tortuosa Blanco; Malaisia tortuosa var. acuminata (Planch.) Bureau; Malaisia tortuosa var. racemosa Bureau; Malaisia tortuosa var. viridescens (Planch.) Bureau; Malaisia viridescens Planch.; Morus javanica Blume; Morus scandens Wall.; Paratrophis ostermeyeri Rech.; Paratrophis viridissima Rech.; Paratrophis zahlbruckneri Rech.; Trophis coccinea Zipp. ex Span.

= Malaisia =

Burny vine

Species of flowering plant

Malaisia is a genus of plants in the fig and mulberry family Moraceae. It is a monotypic genus, meaning that it includes only one species, namely Malaisia scandens, commonly known as burny vine or crow ash. It is a rainforest vine native to areas from southern China, through Southeast Asia to Australia and the western Pacific.

== Description ==
Malaisia scandens is a scandent woody vine with a stem diameter of up to 6 cm (2.4 in); it may climb to a height of 9 m (30 ft). The leaves are dark green above, and paler and somewhat rough on the underside. The leaf margins may be smooth or shallowly toothed, and there are 7–12 lateral veins on either side of the midrib. Twigs and petioles exude a white sap when cut or broken.

Male inflorescences take the form of a catkin and grow up to 3 cm (1.2 in) long in Australia, and up to 6 cm (2.4 in) long in China. Female inflorescences consist of three or four more or less spherical flower clusters together on a peduncle about 1 cm (0.4 in) long. This species is dioecious, meaning that male and female flowers are borne on separate plants.

The fruit is a red ellipsoid drupe about 9 mm (0.35 in) long. Three or four are attached to a warty receptacle.

== Distribution ==
This species is native to the following regions as defined in the World Geographical Scheme for Recording Plant Distributions:

- China: China South-Central, China Southeast, Hainan
- Eastern Asia: Taiwan
- Indo-China: Myanmar, Thailand, Vietnam
- Malesia: Borneo, Jawa, Lesser Sunda Islands, Malaya, Maluku, Philippines, Sulawesi, Sumatera
- Papuasia: New Guinea
- Australia: New South Wales, Northern Territory, Queensland, Western Australia
- Southwestern Pacific: Fiji, New Caledonia, Samoa, Tonga, Vanuatu
- Northwestern Pacific: Caroline Islands, Marianas

=== Habitat ===
Malaisia scandens grows in a variety of forest types including rainforest, monsoon forest, and beach forest. In Australia it occurs at altitudes from sea level to 1,100 m (3,600 ft), and in China it is found up to 300 m (980 ft).

== Taxonomy ==
This plant was first described in 1790, as Caturus scandens, by Portuguese botanist João de Loureiro who erected the genus Caturus Lour. to accommodate the new species. That name, however, was illegitimate as it was a homonym of Caturus L. authored by Carl Linnaeus in 1767. Subsequently, William Jackson Hooker and George Arnott Walker Arnott transferred the species to the genus Trophis in 1837, then in 1855 Jules Émile Planchon transferred it to Malaisia. This last move was reversed when, in 1988, Cornelis Christiaan Berg placed it in a monotypic section of Trophis.

Most recently, the genus Malaisia was reinstated by Wendy L. Clement and George D. Weiblen in a study published in 2009 which examined the relationships within the Moraceae family using both mophological and molecular characters. Within the family, Clement and Weiblen place this species in the tribe Dorstenieae.

Some authorities, such as World Flora Online and the National Herbarium of New South Wales, treat this species as Trophis scandens.

=== Subspecies ===
There are two subspecies – Malaisia scandens subsp. megacarpa was described in 1986 by English botanist Peter Shaw Green, and is endemic to Lord Howe Island. The other subspecies is the autonym M. scandens subsp. scandens.

== Gallery ==
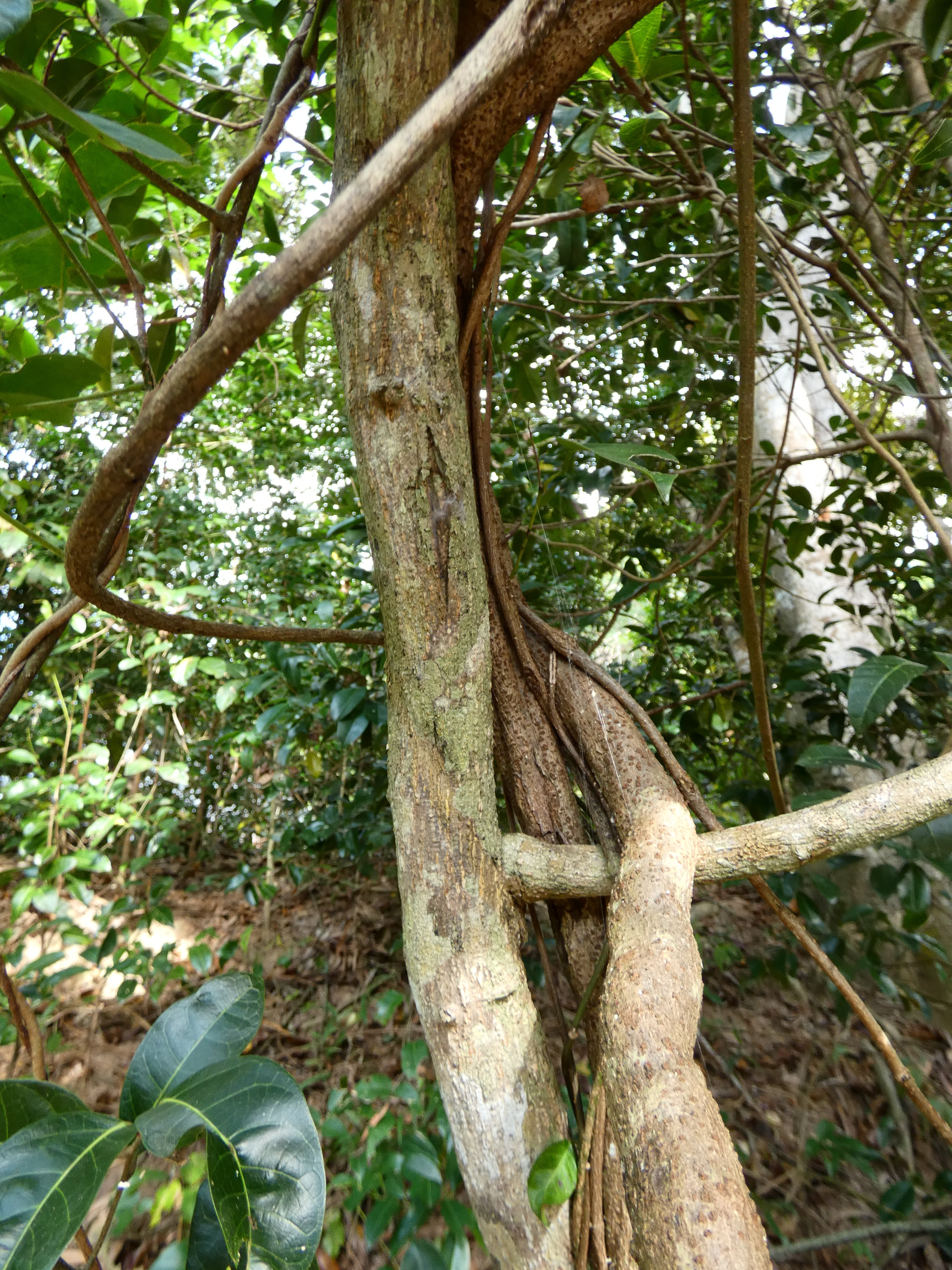
Vine stem

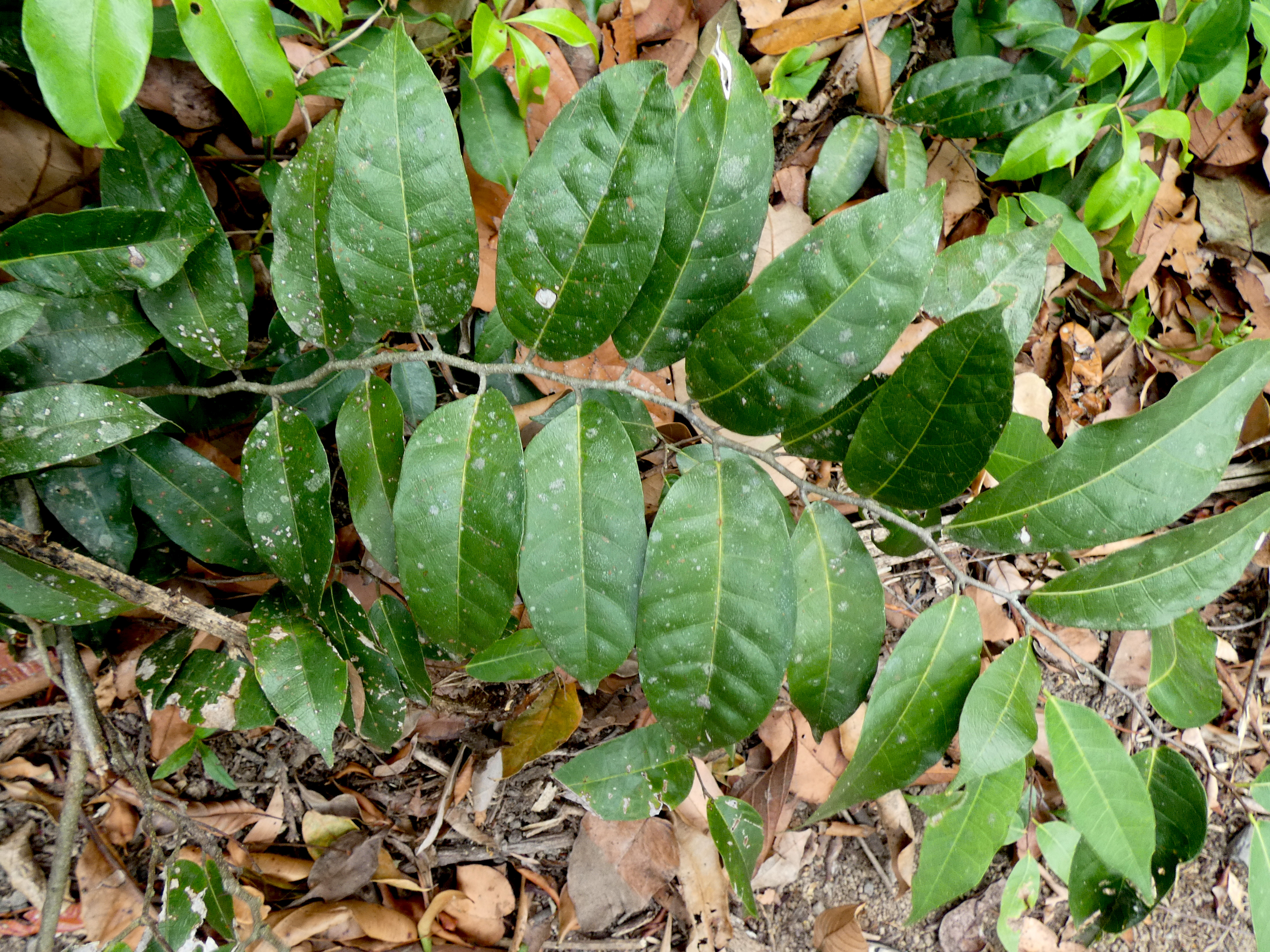
Foliage

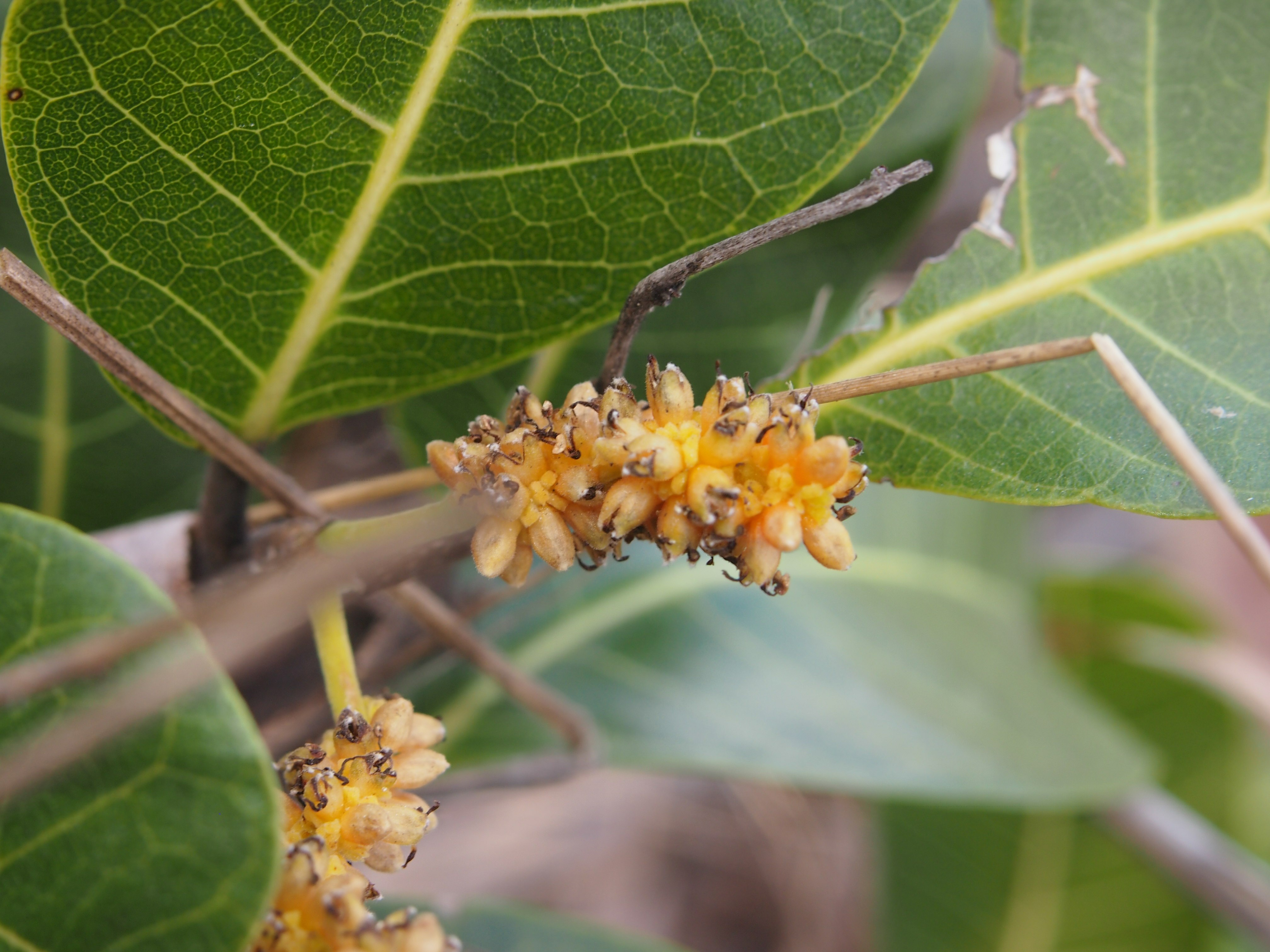
Male flowers

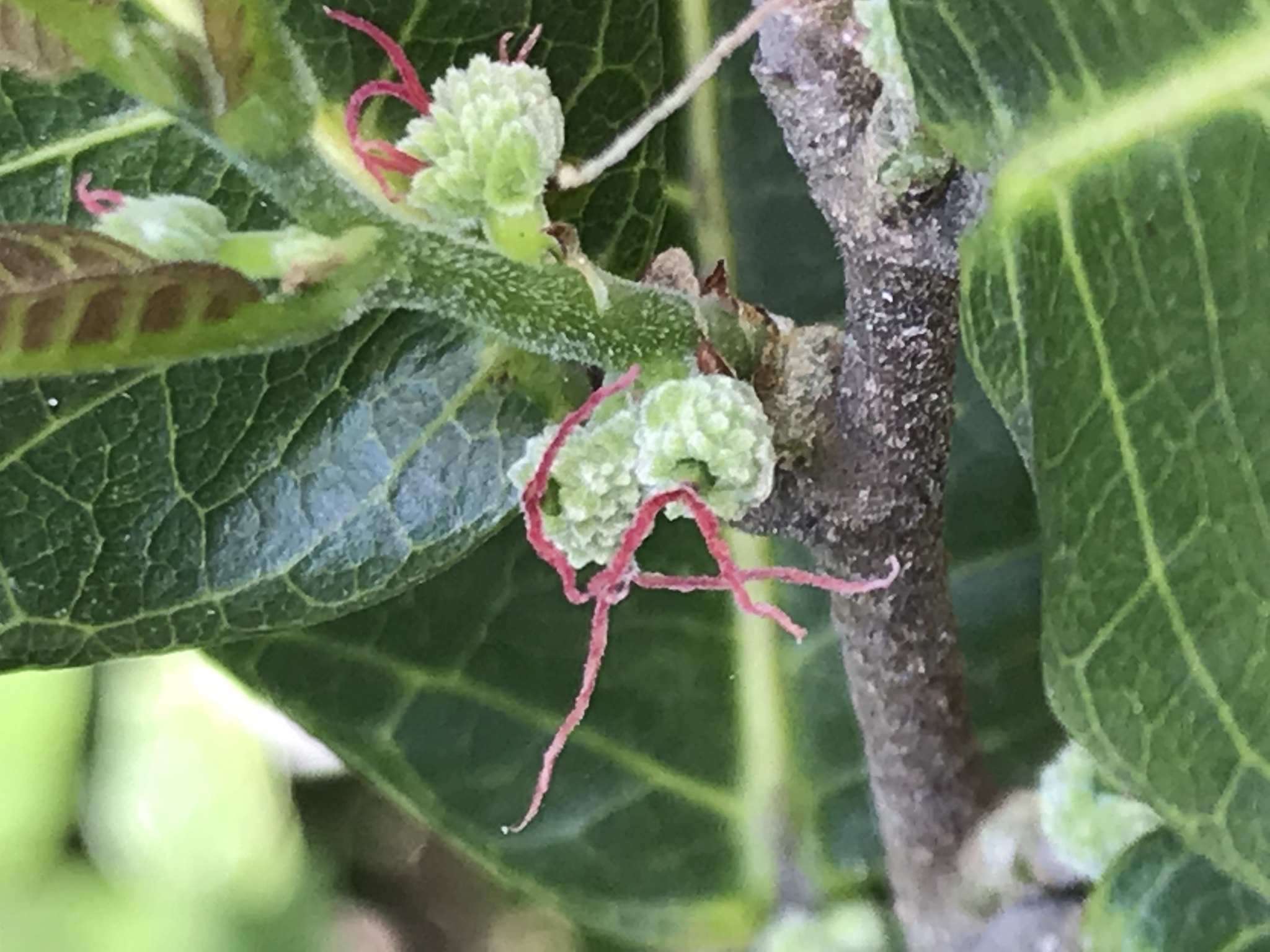
Female flower

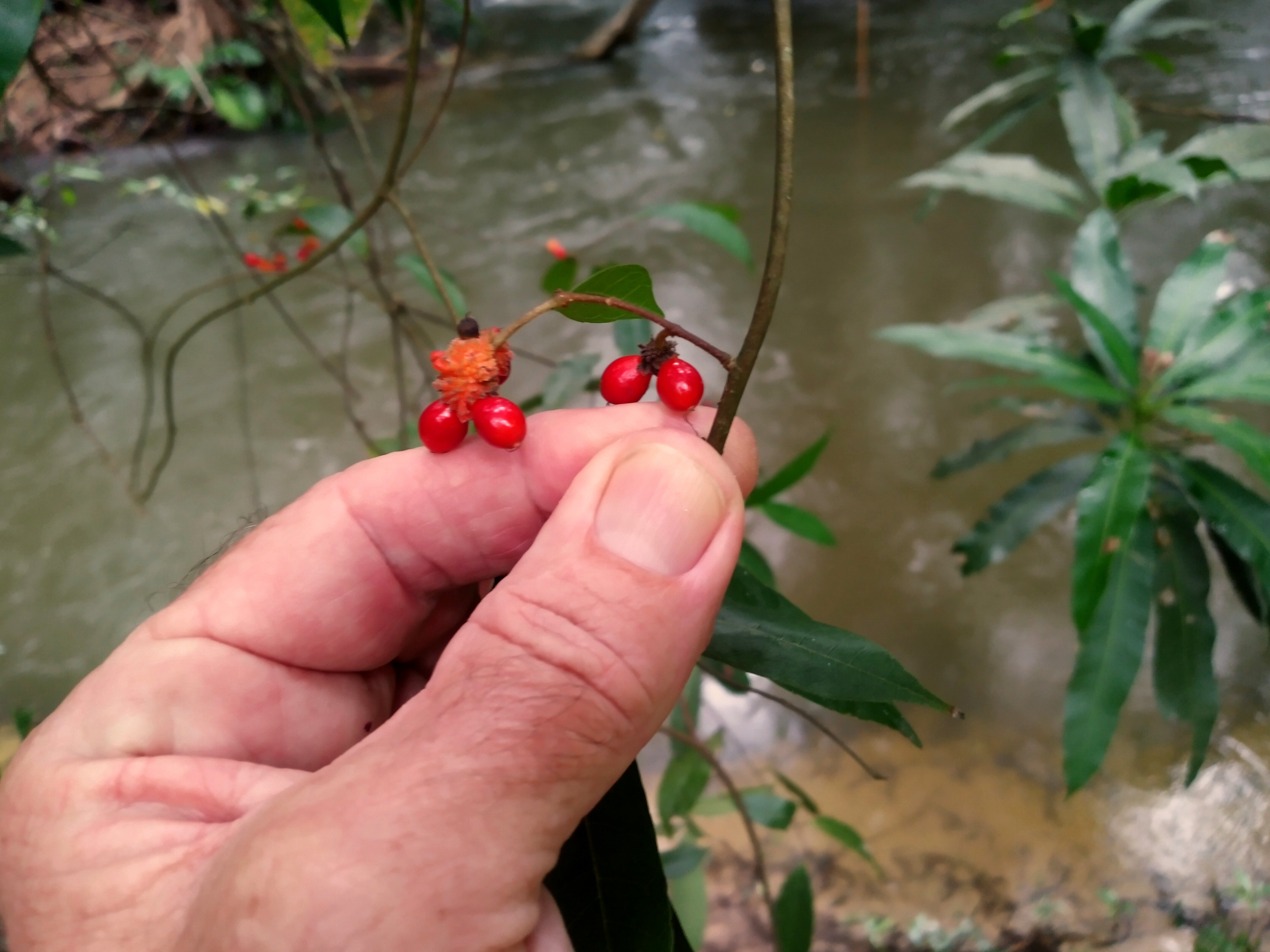
Fruit

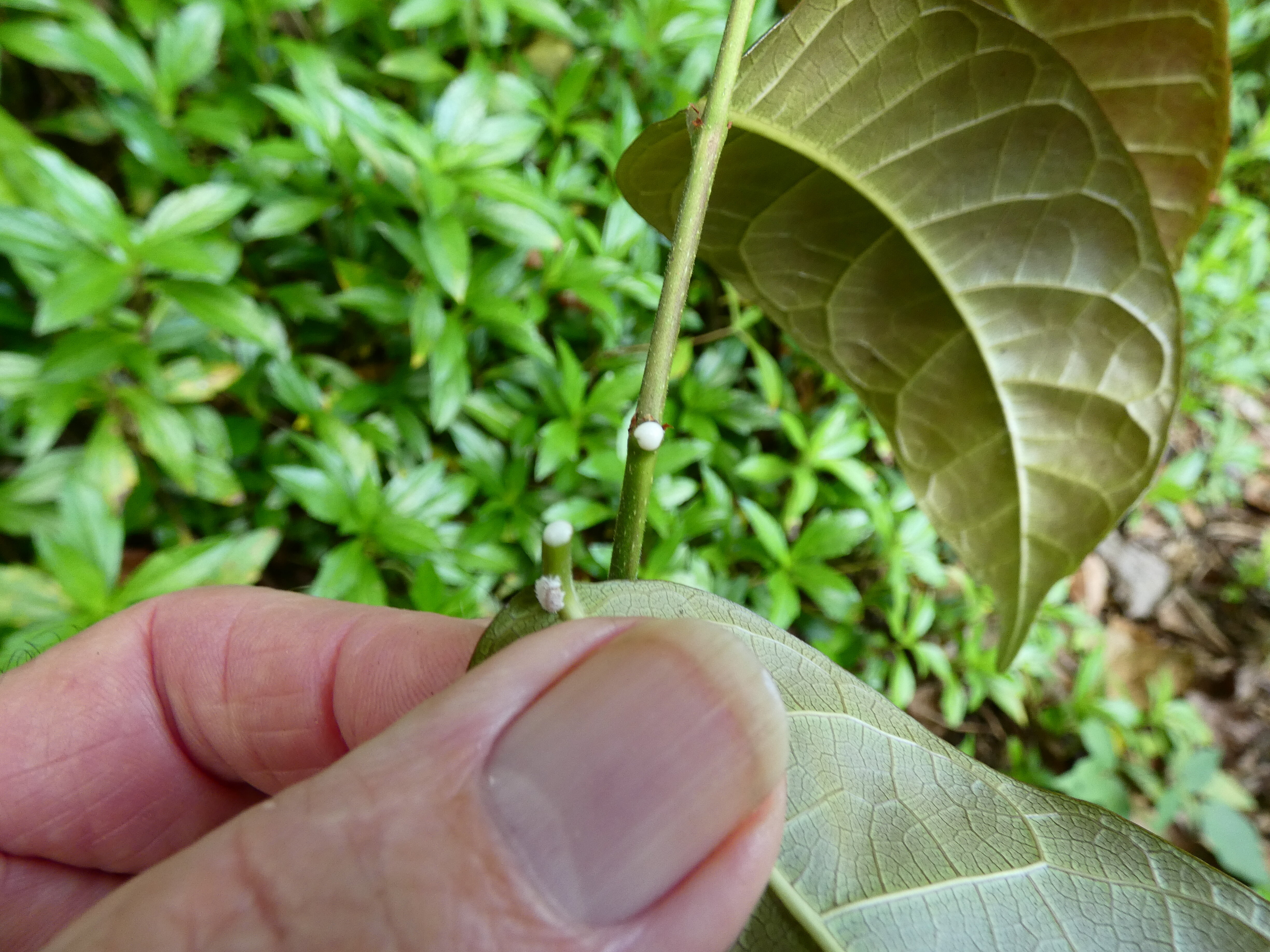
Milky sap
