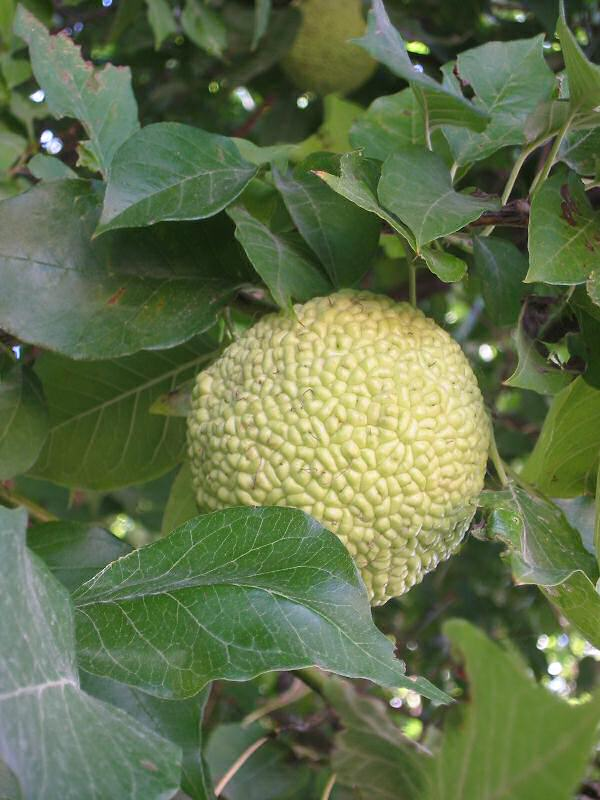
- M. pomifera foliage and fruit

Scientific classification
- Kingdom: Plantae
- Clade: Tracheophytes
- Clade: Angiosperms
- Clade: Eudicots
- Clade: Rosids
- Order: Rosales
- Family: Moraceae
- Tribe: Maclureae
- Genus: Maclura; Nutt.

Species
- 13; see text

Synonyms
- Cardiogyne Bureau (1873); Chlorophora Gaudich. (1830); Cudrania Trécul (1847), nom. cons.; Cudranus Miq. (1859), orth. var.; Fusticus Raf. (1838); Ioxylon Raf. (1818); × Macludrania André (1905); Plecospermum Trécul (1847); Sukaminea Raf. (1838); Toxylon Raf. (1818); Vanieria Lour. (1790)

= Maclura =

Maclura Temporal range: Paleogene–Recent (Molecular clock)

Genus of flowering plants

Maclura is a genus of flowering plants in the mulberry family, Moraceae. It includes the inedible Osage orange, which is used as mosquito repellent and grown throughout the United States as a hedging plant. It is dioecious, with male and female flowers borne on separate plants.

Maclura is closely related to the genus Cudrania, and hybrids between the two genera have been produced. Some botanists recognize a more broadly defined Maclura that includes species previously included in Cudrania and other genera of Moraceae. The genus likely originated in South America during the Paleogene.

== Species ==
13 species are accepted.

- Maclura africana (Bureau) Corner – eastern Africa and Madagascar
- Maclura andamanica (King ex Hook.f.) C.C.Berg – Vietnam, Laos to Andaman Islands
- Maclura brasiliensis (Mart.) Endl. – Brazil, Honduras, Nicaragua, Peru, and Venezuela
- Maclura cochinchinensis (Lour.) Corner (Syn.: Cudrania cochinchinensis, Cudrania javanensis, Vanieria cochinchinensis) – China, Vietnam, Malesia, and northern Australia
- Maclura fruticosa (Roxb.) Corner – China and Vietnam
- Maclura mollis (Fernald) Carvajal – Mexico (Oaxaca)
- Maclura montana Z.P.Lei, G.Y.Li & Z.H.Chen – China (Zhejiang)
- Maclura orientalis G.Y.Li, W.Y.Xie & Z.H.Chen – China (Zhejiang)
- Maclura pomifera (Raf.) C.K.Schneid. (Raf.) C.K.Schneid. – Osage-orange; United States
- Maclura pubescens (Trécul) Z.K.Zhou & M.G.Gilbert (Syn.: M. cochichinensis var. pubescens) – China
- Maclura spinosa (Willd.) C.C.Berg – India to Sri Lanka
- Maclura tinctoria (L.) D.Don ex Steud. – Mexico to northern Argentina
- Maclura tricuspidata Carrière (Syn.: Cudrania tricuspidata, Cudrania triloba) – China, Vietnam, and Korea

=== Formerly placed here ===
- Milicia excelsa (as Maclura excelsa)
- Milicia regia (as Maclura regia)
- Broussonetia greveana (as Maclura greveana and Maclura humbertii)

== Etymology ==
The genus is named in honor of William Maclure (1763-1840), a Scottish-born American geologist and educational reformer. The President of the American Academy of Natural Sciences of Philadelphia for 22 years, Maclure made major contributions to his field, including the first true geological map of any part of North America, and was a strong advocate of universal education, especially for women.

== Fossil record ==
Fossils similar to Maclura have been reported from the Middle Eocene of England.
