= M. excelsa =

M. excelsa may refer to:

- Metrosideros excelsa, the pohutukawa, a coastal evergreen tree species
- Milicia excelsa, a tree species from tropical Africa
- Myrmica excelsa Kupyanskaya, an ant species in the genus Myrmica

== See also ==
- Excelsa (disambiguation)
