= M. brasiliensis =

M. brasiliensis may refer to:

- Maclura brasiliensis, a plant species
- Mawsonia brasiliensis, an extinct fish species
