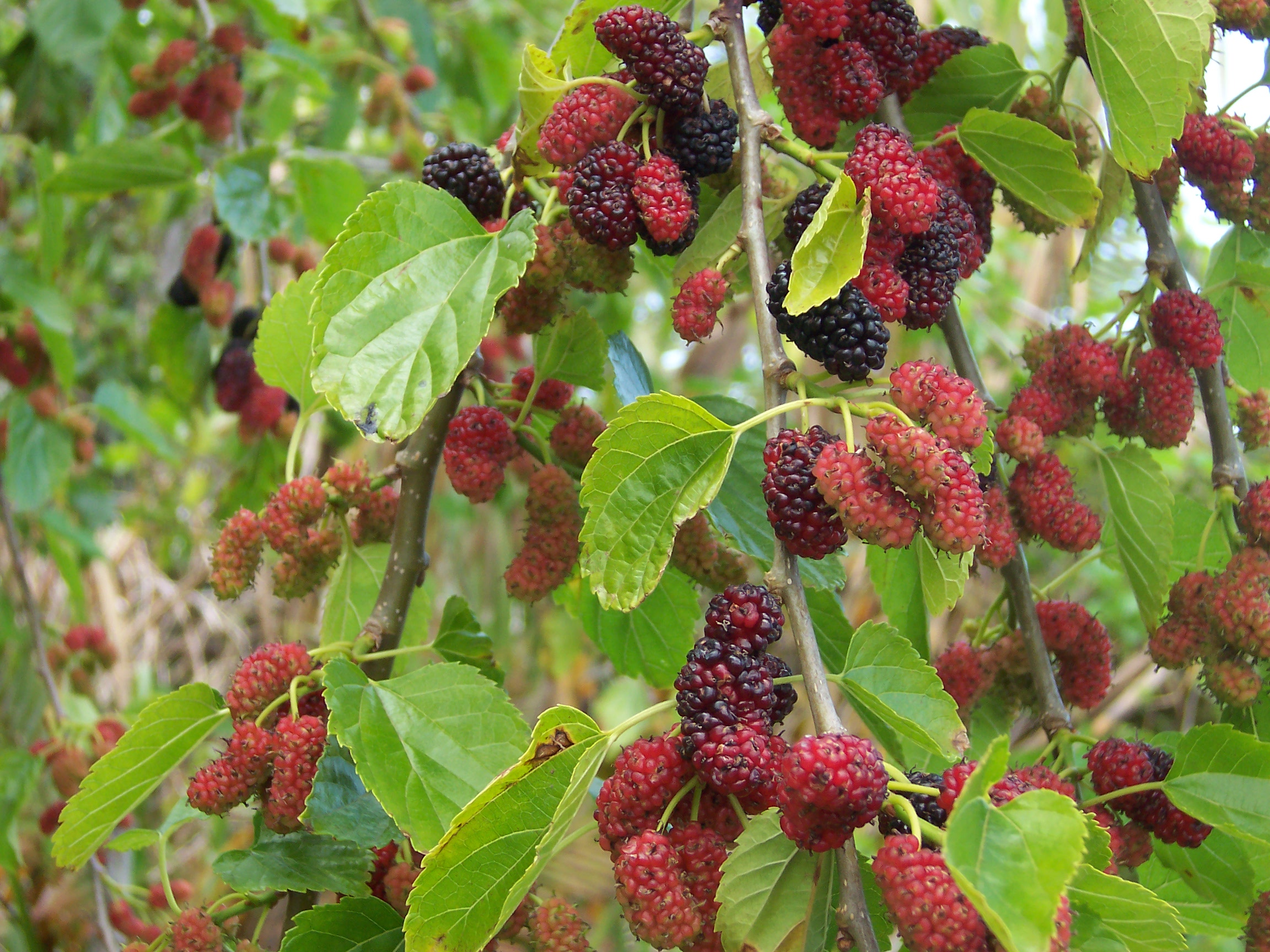
- Fruit of Morus alba

Scientific classification
- Kingdom: Plantae
- Clade: Tracheophytes
- Clade: Angiosperms
- Clade: Eudicots
- Clade: Rosids
- Order: Rosales
- Family: Moraceae
- Tribe: Moreae; Dumort.

= Moreae =

Tribe of flowering plants

Moreae is a tribe within the plant family Moraceae. It includes 6–10 genera and 70–80 species, including Morus, the genus that includes the mulberries, and Maclura, the genus that includes the Osage orange.

Recent work suggests that the tribe is polyphyletic.

== Description ==
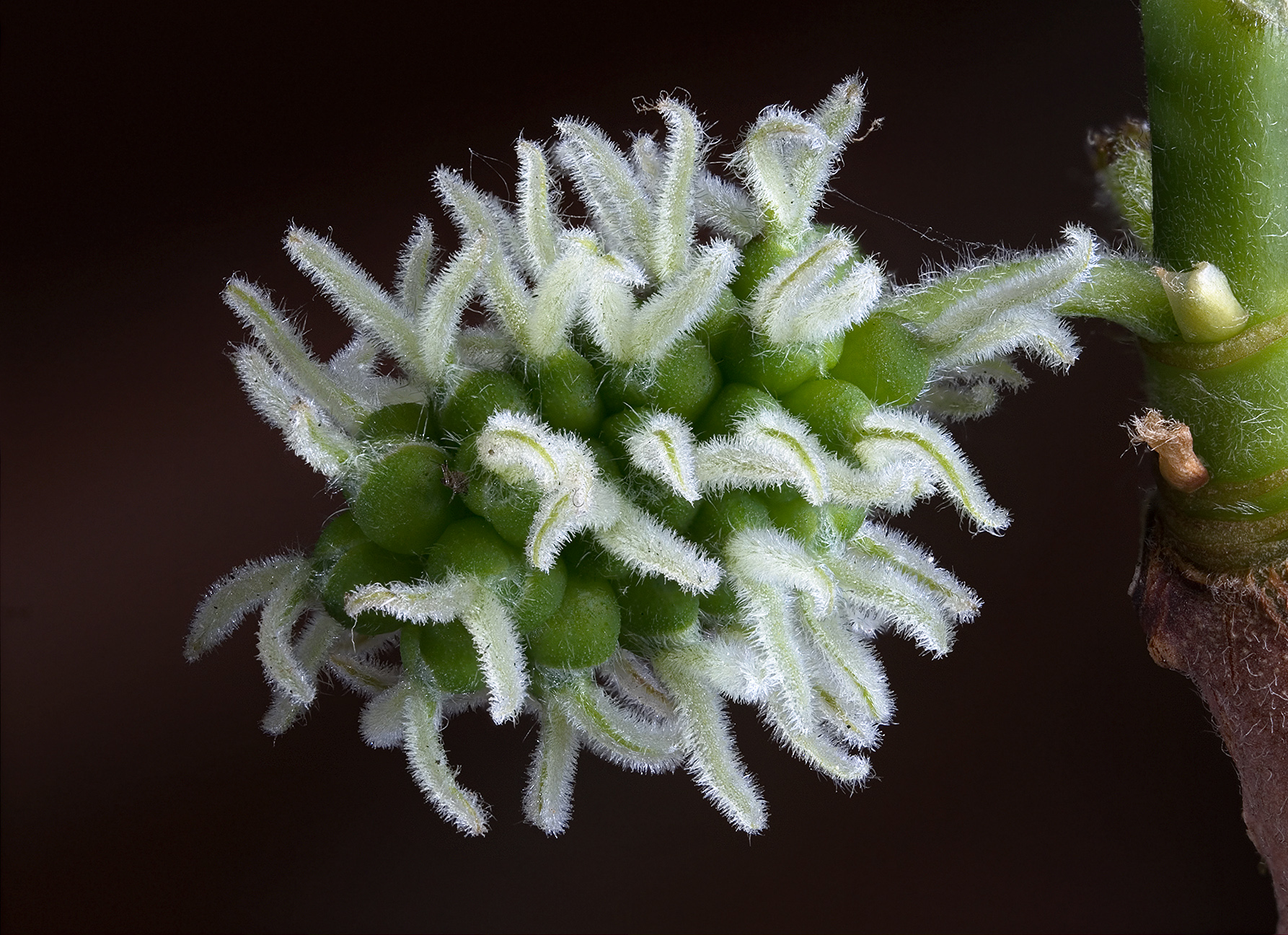
Female inflorescence of Morus nigra

The Moreae are a tribe of trees, shrubs, climbers and herbs that are usually dioecious. Their inflorescences are simpler than most other Moraceae. Their flowers are adapted for wind pollination.

Members of the tribe are characterised by having inflexed or "urticaceous" stamens. The way in which the anther filaments elongate in the developing flower bud causes the anthers to "spring back explosively" when the flower opens. This releases pollen into the air, facilitating wind-pollination. These characters are considered plesiomorphic—traits that were present in the ancestors of the Moraceae which have been retained in the Moreae.

== Taxonomy ==
The tribe is based on Morus, the genus that includes the mulberries. The name Morus was first published by Carl Linnaeus in 1753 in Species Plantarum.

Cornelis Berg included eight genera in the tribe Moreae—Bleekrodea, Broussonetia, Fatoua, Maclura, Milicia, Morus, Streblus and Trophis—which included 73 species.

About 40 generic names have been coined for these species, resulting in a situation with many genera and few species. In 1962 British botanist E. J. H. Corner reworked this arrangement, merging many genera. This resulting in an expansion of several genera, most notably Maclura, Streblus and Trophis. These were further reorganised by Berg in the 1980s. He found that while it was easy to define the tribe (based on the presence of urticaceous stamens), the definitions of the genera were more challenging.

In an attempt to sort out the evolutionary history of the Moraceae Shannon Datwyler and George Weiblen use the chloroplast ndhF gene to build a phylogeny of the family. They determined that the tribe Moreae was polyphyletic and consisted of two groups—a core "Moreae sensu stricto" (Moreae s.s.), which formed a monophyletic group within the tribe, and a broader "Moreae sensu lato (Moreae s.l.). Streblus and Trophis were found to be polyphyletic, with some species in each genus being placed in Moreae s.s while others were only included in Moreae s.l. They also transferred Bagassa and Sorocea from the Artocarpeae to the Moreae.

Based on chloroplast ndhF gene sequences, Moreae s.s. is a sister taxon to the Artocarpeae if Bagassa and Sorocea are included in the Moreae. So defined, Moreae s.s. includes Bagassa, Morus, Milicia and Sorocea, together with some (but not all) of the species currently placed in Streblus and Trophis. Moreae s.l. included all of these genera, together with Bleekrodea, Broussonetia, Fatoua, Maclura and the remaining species in Streblus and Trophis. The latter group was found to be a sister to the tribe Dorstenieae.

=== Evolutionary history ===
Few fossils can be definitively assigned to the Moreae. Fruits from the upper Eocene, Miocene and Tertiary have been assigned to Broussonetia, and fruit matching modern Morus have been found in the early Eocene. Based on rates of molecular evolution in chloroplast and nuclear genes, the Moreae s.s. is estimated to be about 59–79 million years old. Nyree Zerega and colleagues proposed a Laurasian origin for the Moreae s.s., with three separate colonisations of South America (by Sorocea, Bagassa and Trophis) and a later colonisation of Africa by Milicia.

== Distribution ==
Most genera in the tribe are predominantly tropical, sometimes with a few temperate species (like Maclura). Two genera, Broussonetia and Morus, are predominantly temperate.
