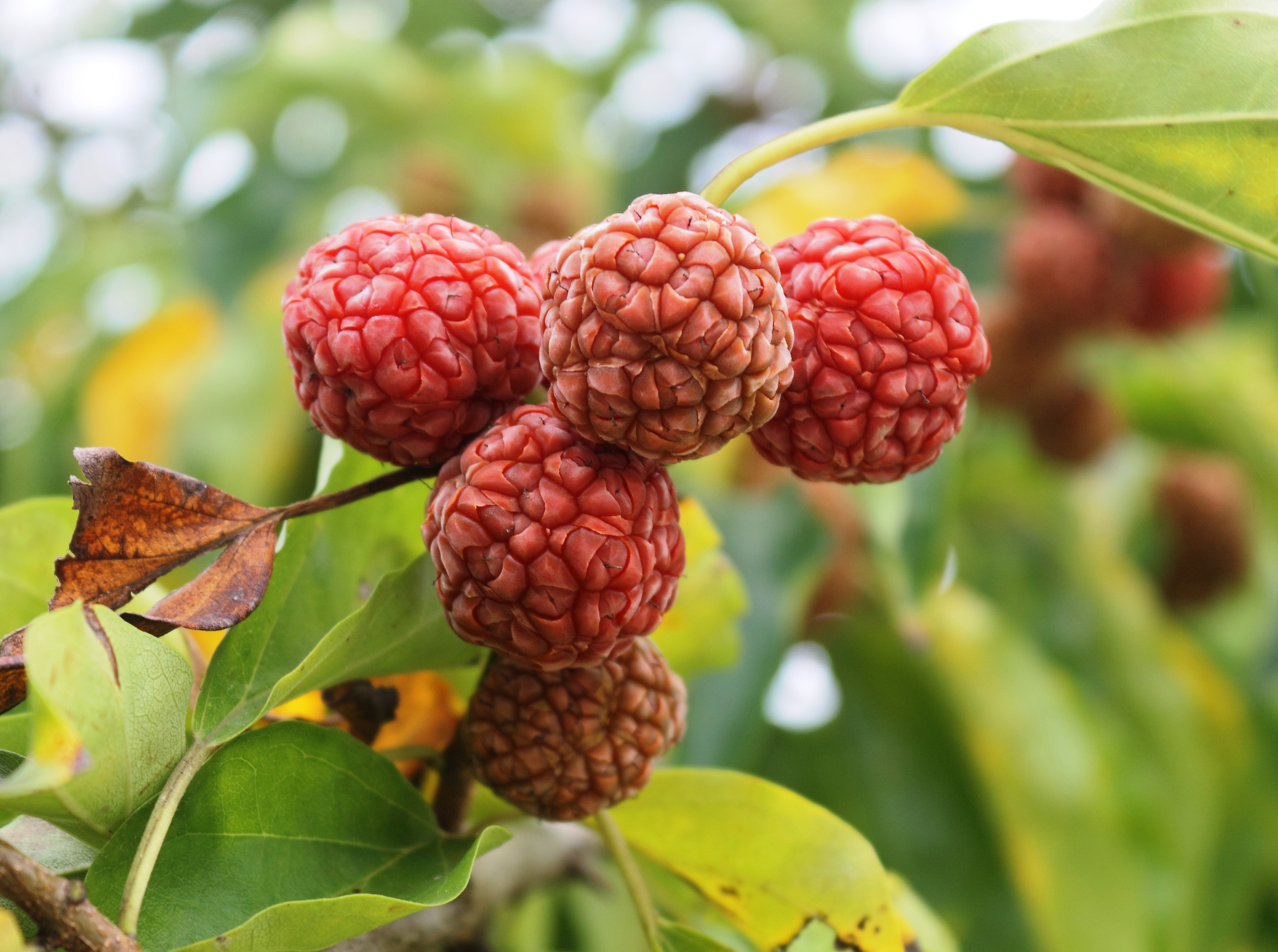

Conservation status
- Least Concern (IUCN 3.1)

Scientific classification
- Kingdom: Plantae
- Clade: Tracheophytes
- Clade: Angiosperms
- Clade: Eudicots
- Clade: Rosids
- Order: Rosales
- Family: Moraceae
- Genus: Maclura
- Species: M. tricuspidata

Binomial name
- Maclura tricuspidata Carrière

Synonyms
- Cudrania tricuspidata (Carrière) Bureau; Cudrania triloba Hance; Morus integrifolia H.Lév. & Vaniot; Vaniera tricuspidata (Carrière) Hu; Vanieria triloba (Hance) Satake

= Maclura tricuspidata =

Species of tree

Maclura tricuspidata is a tree native to central and southern China, Korea, and Vietnam. It is occasionally grown for its fruit, somewhat similar to that of the related mulberry (Morus spp.).

== Common names ==
Among its common names are Chinese mulberry (but not to be confused with Morus australis also known by that name), storehousebush, mandarin melon berry, silkworm thorn, cudrang, kkujibbong (Korean 꾸지뽕), zhe or che (Chinese: 柘; pinyin: zhè).

== Description ==
It grows up to 6 m high.

The Tanzhe Temple west of Beijing, China is named for this tree.

== Uses ==
Aside from its edible fruit, which can also be used to make wine, the tree has several other uses. In China, its leaves are fed to silkworms, its bark is used to make paper and a reddish-yellow dye, and its roots are used for medicinal purposes. Its wood is also valuable, and is used for the construction of bows.

== Fossil record ==
Fossils similar to Maclura tricuspidata have been collected from the Eocene of France, Miocene of Bulgaria, Pliocene of China, and Quaternary of Japan.
