= Sorocea guilleminiana =

Conservation status
- Least Concern (IUCN 3.1)

Scientific classification
- Kingdom: Plantae
- Clade: Tracheophytes
- Clade: Angiosperms
- Clade: Eudicots
- Clade: Rosids
- Order: Rosales
- Family: Moraceae
- Genus: Sorocea
- Species: S. guilleminiana

Binomial name
- Sorocea guilleminiana Gaudichaud

Synonyms
- Sorocea castaneifolia Huber; Sorocea grandifolia S.Moore; Sorocea hilariana (Casar.) Bureau; Sorocea houllettiana Gaudich.; Sorocea ilicifolia var. grandifolia Miq.; Sorocea macrogyna Lanj. & Wess.Boer; Trophis hilariana Casar.

Species of tree

Sorocea guilleminiana is a species of flowering plant in the family Moraceae. It is a tree native to eastern and west-central Brazil, Bolivia, Peru, Ecuador, and southeastern Colombia in South America.
