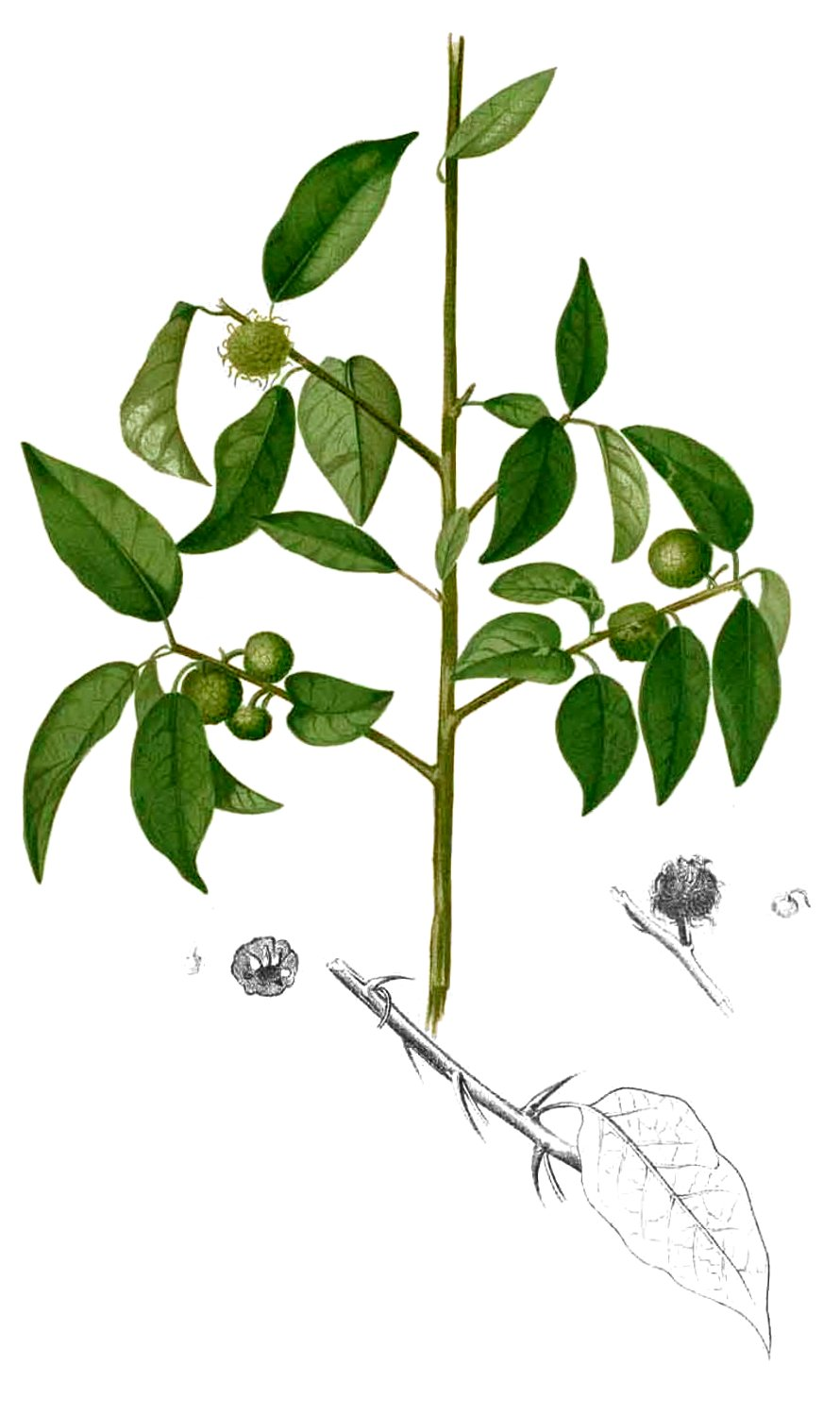

Scientific classification
- Kingdom: Plantae
- Clade: Embryophytes
- Clade: Tracheophytes
- Clade: Spermatophytes
- Clade: Angiosperms
- Clade: Eudicots
- Clade: Rosids
- Order: Rosales
- Family: Moraceae
- Genus: Maclura
- Species: M. cochinchinensis

Binomial name
- Maclura cochinchinensis (Lour.) Corner

Synonyms
- List: Cudrania cochinchinensis (Lour.) Yakuro Kudo & Masam.; Vanieria cochinchinensis Lour.; Cudrania spinosus Kuntze; Cudrania acuminata Miq.; Cudrania amboinensis (Blume) Miq.; Cudrania cambodiana Gagnep.; Cudrania cochinchinensis var. gerontogea (Siebold & Zucc.) Kudô & Masam.; Cudrania grandifolia Merr.; Cudrania integra F.T.Wang & Tang; Cudrania javanensis Trécul; Cudrania javanensis var. bancroftii F.M.Bailey; Cudrania obovata Trécul; Cudrania rectispina Hance; Cudrania rumphii Thwaites; Cudrania sumatrana Miq.; Cudrania thorelii Gagnep.; Maclura amboinensis Blume; Maclura amboinensis var. paucinervia Corner; Maclura calcar-galli Lodd. ex Voigt; Maclura cochinchinensis var. bancroftii (F.M.Bailey) Corner; Maclura cochinchinensis var. gerontogea (Siebold & Zucc.) H.Ohashi; Maclura gerontogea Siebold & Zucc.; Maclura javanica Blume; Maclura thorelii (Gagnep.) Corner; Maclura timorensis Blume; Morus calcar-galli A.Cunn. ex Loudon; Morus cudranus Buch.-Ham. ex Wall.; Morus tinctoria Blanco; Plecospermum cuneifolium Thwaites; Plecospermum spinosum var. javanensis Trécul; Trophis fruticosa Hook. & Arn.; Trophis spinosa Blume; Vanieria alternifolia Stokes; Vanieria cochinchinensis var. gerontogea (Siebold & Zucc.) Nakai; Boehmeria cochinchinensis Pers.; Procris cochinchinensis Spreng.

= Maclura cochinchinensis =

Species of shrub

Maclura cochinchinensis is a species of flowering plant in the family Moraceae. This vine or scrambling shrub is sometimes referred to by the common name cockspur thorn. The native range extends from China, through Malesia and into Queensland and northern New South Wales in Australia. The species inhabits various types of tropical forest: most commonly in monsoon forests. The globular, yellow or orange fruit are sweet and edible and were a traditional food source for Aboriginal Australians.
