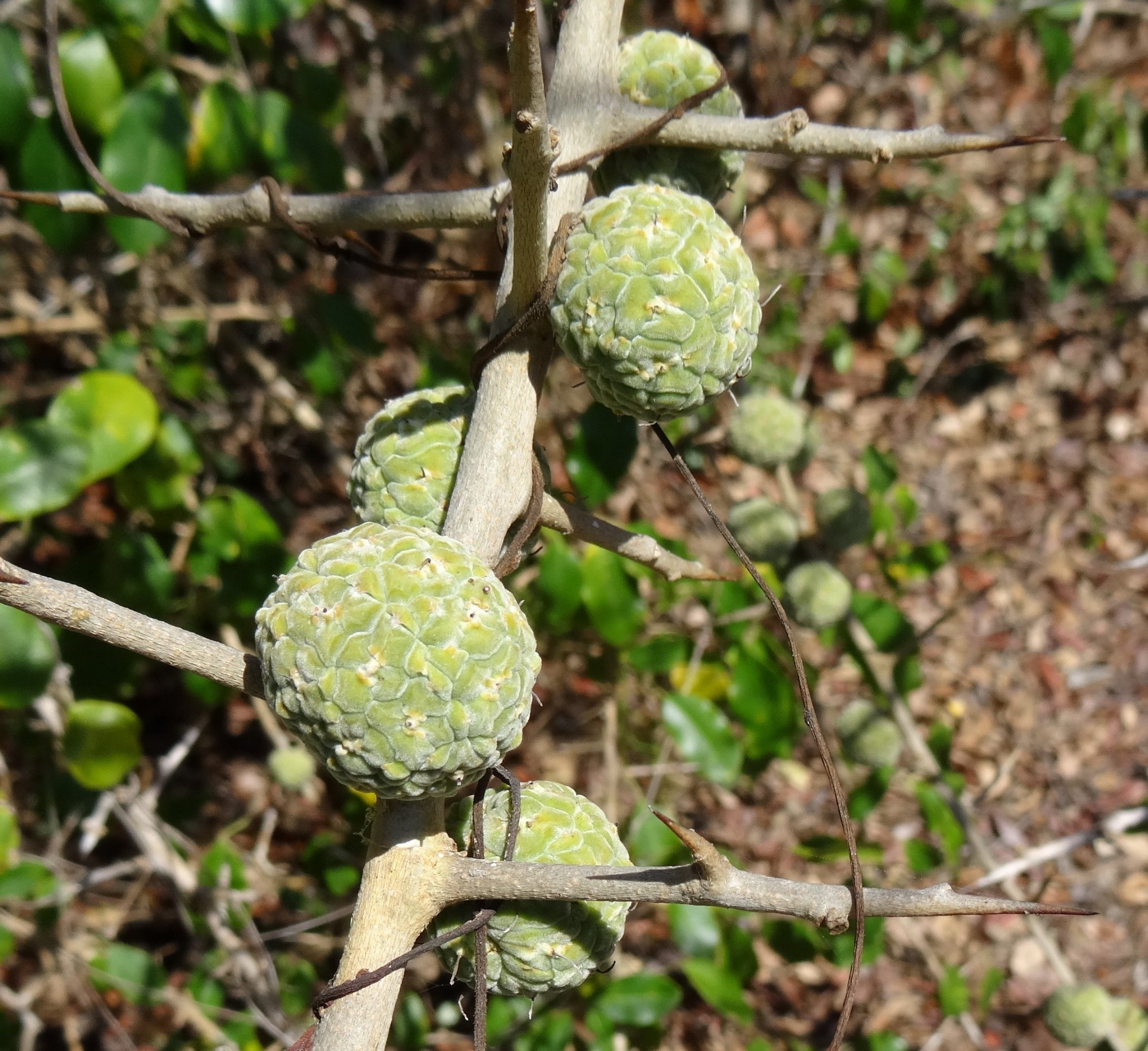

Conservation status
- Least Concern (IUCN 3.1)

Scientific classification
- Kingdom: Plantae
- Clade: Tracheophytes
- Clade: Angiosperms
- Clade: Eudicots
- Clade: Rosids
- Order: Rosales
- Family: Moraceae
- Genus: Maclura
- Species: M. africana

Binomial name
- Maclura africana (Bureau) Corner

Synonyms
- Cardiogyne africana Bureau; Milicia spinosa Sim

= Maclura africana =

Species of plant

Maclura africana, also known as a thorny mulberry or African Osage orange, is a tree native to Kenya, Madagascar, Malawi, Mozambique, Tanzania, South Africa, Zambia and Zimbabwe. In South Africa it is found in the northeastern Limpopo, Mpumalanga and KwaZulu-Natal provinces. The tree's FSA number is 44.1.

The species was first described as Cardiogyne africana by Louis Édouard Bureau in 1873. In 1962 Edred John Henry Corner placed the species in genus Maclura as M. africana.

== Sources ==
- REDLIST Sanbi
- Plants of the World Online
