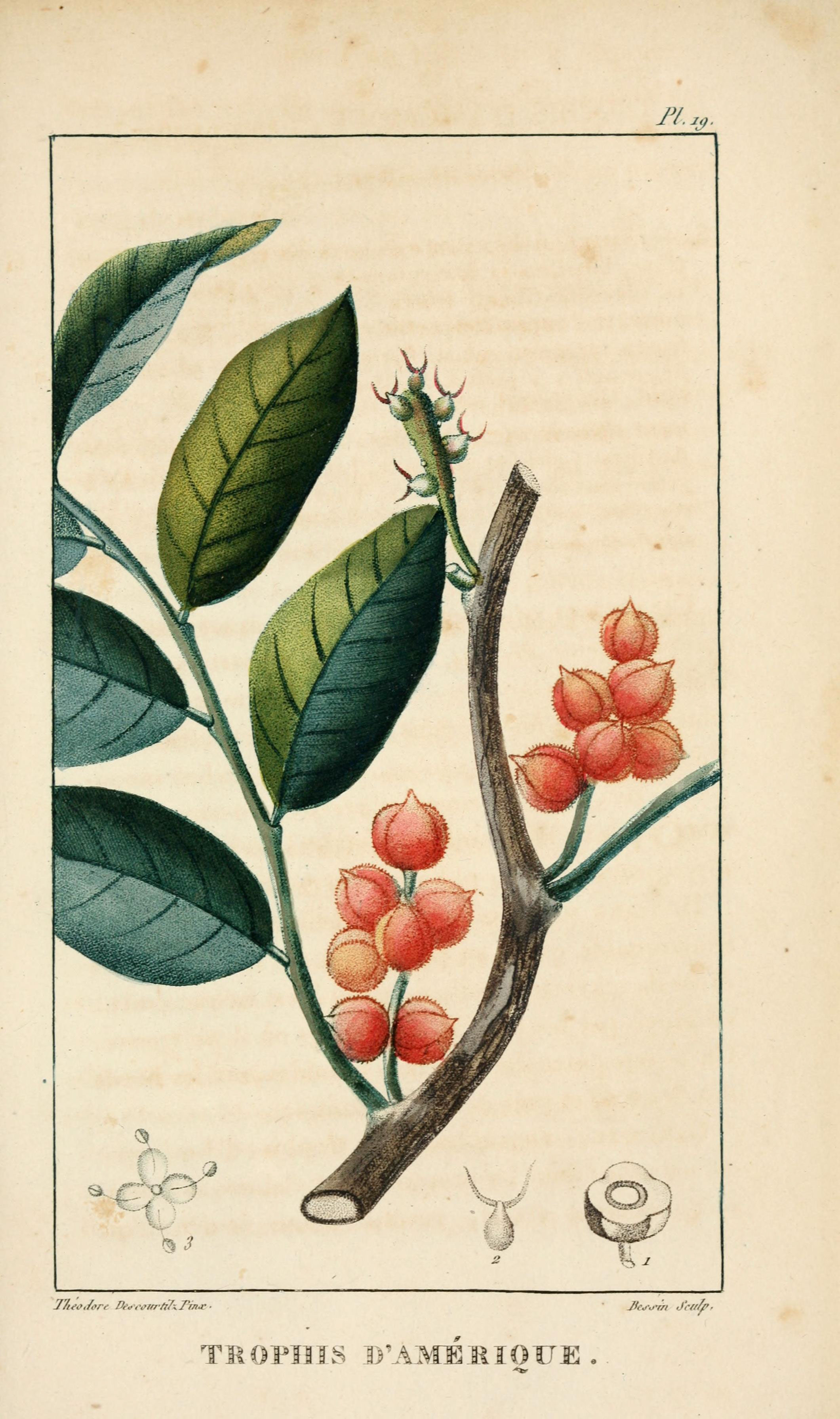

Conservation status
- Least Concern (IUCN 3.1)

Scientific classification
- Kingdom: Plantae
- Clade: Tracheophytes
- Clade: Angiosperms
- Clade: Eudicots
- Clade: Rosids
- Order: Rosales
- Family: Moraceae
- Genus: Trophis
- Species: T. racemosa

Binomial name
- Trophis racemosa (L.) Urb.

Synonyms
- Bucephalon racemosum L.; Clarisia urophylla (Donn.Sm.) Lanj.; Pseudolmedia karstenii Pittier; Sahagunia urophylla Donn.Sm.; Sorocea colombiana Standl.; Trophis americana L.; Trophis americana var. meridionalis Bureau; Trophis americana var. ramon (Schltdl. & Cham.) Bureau; Trophis racemosa subsp. meridionalis (Bureau) W.C.Burger; Trophis racemosa var. meridionalis (Bureau) J.F.Macbr.; Trophis racemosa subsp. ramon (Schltdl. & Cham.) W.C.Burger; Trophis ramon Schltdl. & Cham.

= Trophis racemosa =

Species of flowering plant

Trophis racemosa, commonly named white ramoon, is a species of flowering plant of the fig family. It is a shrub or tree native to Mexico, Central America, the Greater Antilles, Colombia, northern Brazil, Ecuador, Peru, and Venezuela in the tropical Americas. It reaches up to 20 metres tall with a trunk up to 50 cm in diameter. It grows in lowland tropical moist forests, in montane oak forests, and at the margins of cloud forests, up to 1,200 metres elevation.
