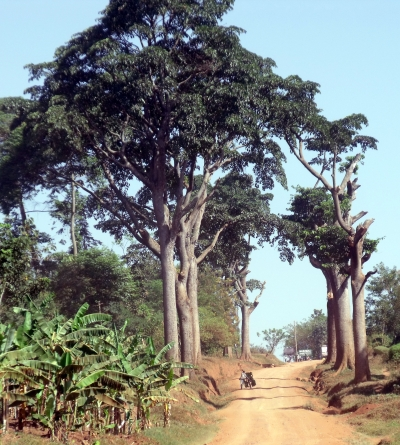
- Milicia excelsa, Uganda

Scientific classification
- Kingdom: Plantae
- Clade: Embryophytes
- Clade: Tracheophytes
- Clade: Spermatophytes
- Clade: Angiosperms
- Clade: Eudicots
- Clade: Rosids
- Order: Rosales
- Family: Moraceae
- Tribe: Moreae
- Genus: Milicia; Sim

Species
- Milicia excelsa Milicia regia

= Iroko =

Genus of plants of the family Moraceae

Iroko (Yoruba: Ìrókò) is a large hardwood tree from the west coast of tropical Africa that can live up to 500 years. This is the common name for the genus Milicia, in which there are two recognized species, which are closely related: Milicia excelsa and Milicia regia.

The genus name of Milicia is in honour of Milici (19th and 20th centuries), an administrator in Portuguese East Africa (in modern-day Mozambique) who supported the work of the author of the genus, Thomas Robertson Sim. It was first described and published in Forest Fl. Port. E. Afr. on page 97 in 1909.

The tree is known to the Yoruba as ìrókò, logo or loko and is believed to have healing properties. Iroko is known to the Igbo people as ọjị wood. It is one of the woods sometimes referred to as African teak, although it is unrelated to the teak family. The wood colour is initially yellow but darkens to a richer copper brown over time.

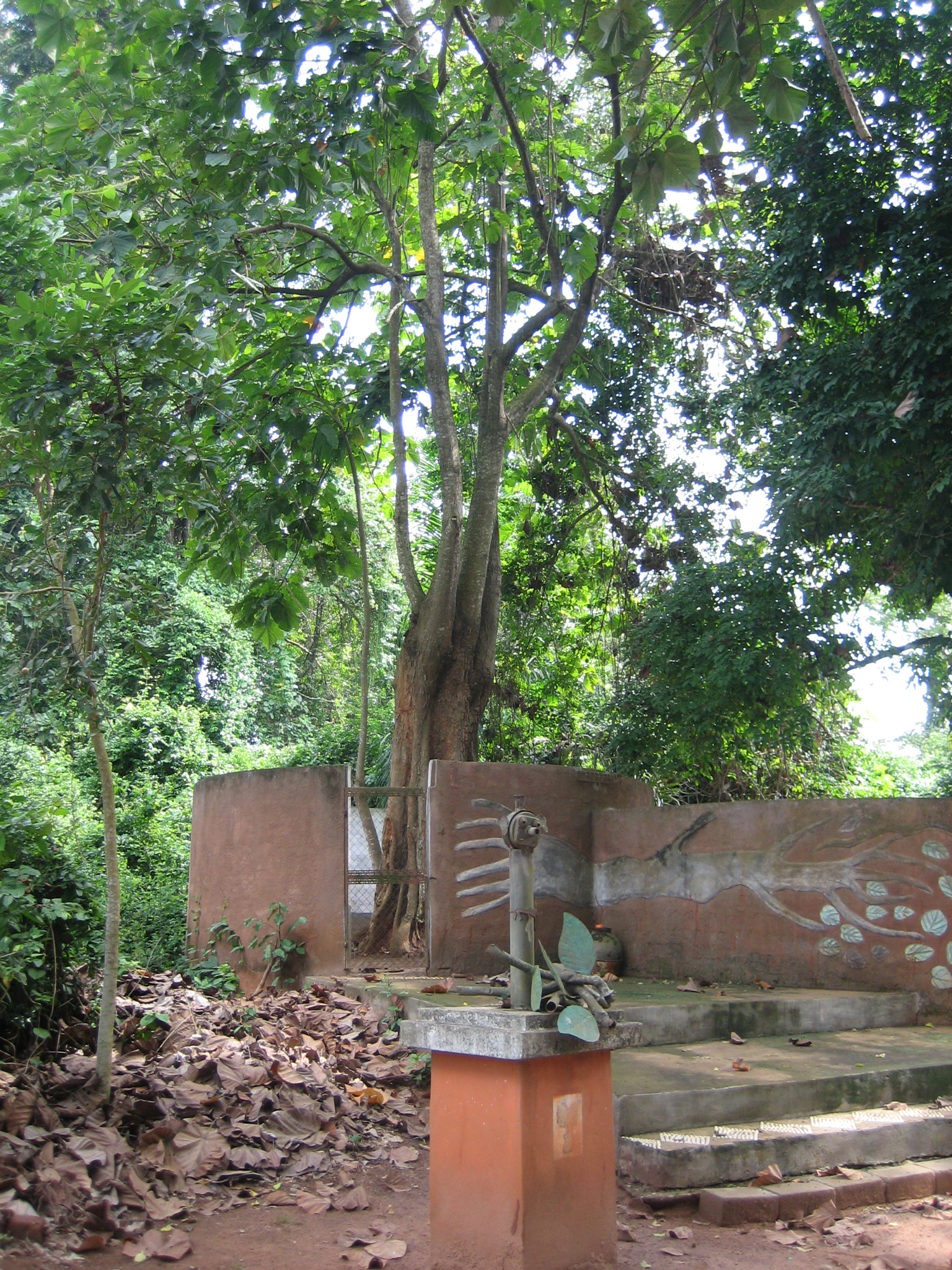
Iroko tree

== Names in other languages ==
- Yoruba : Ìrókò, Ùróko
- Gbe languages : Loko, Roko
- Sranan Tongo: Loko
- Igbo: Ọ́jị̀
- Hausa: Kuuka
- Edo : Uloko
- Urhobo : Uno
- Akan languages : Odum
- Kikongo : Kambala
- Ijaw : Olokpata
- Ejagham : Nsan

== Species ==
Iroko is yielded mostly (probably) by Milicia excelsa. In much of the literature on this timber the names of the trees that yield it are given as Chlorophora excelsa (syn. Milicia excelsa) and Chlorophora regia (syn. Milicia regia).

Milicia excelsa is currently listed as 'near threatened' on the IUCN Red List.

Both species are dioecious, with male and female flowers on separate individuals.

== Uses ==
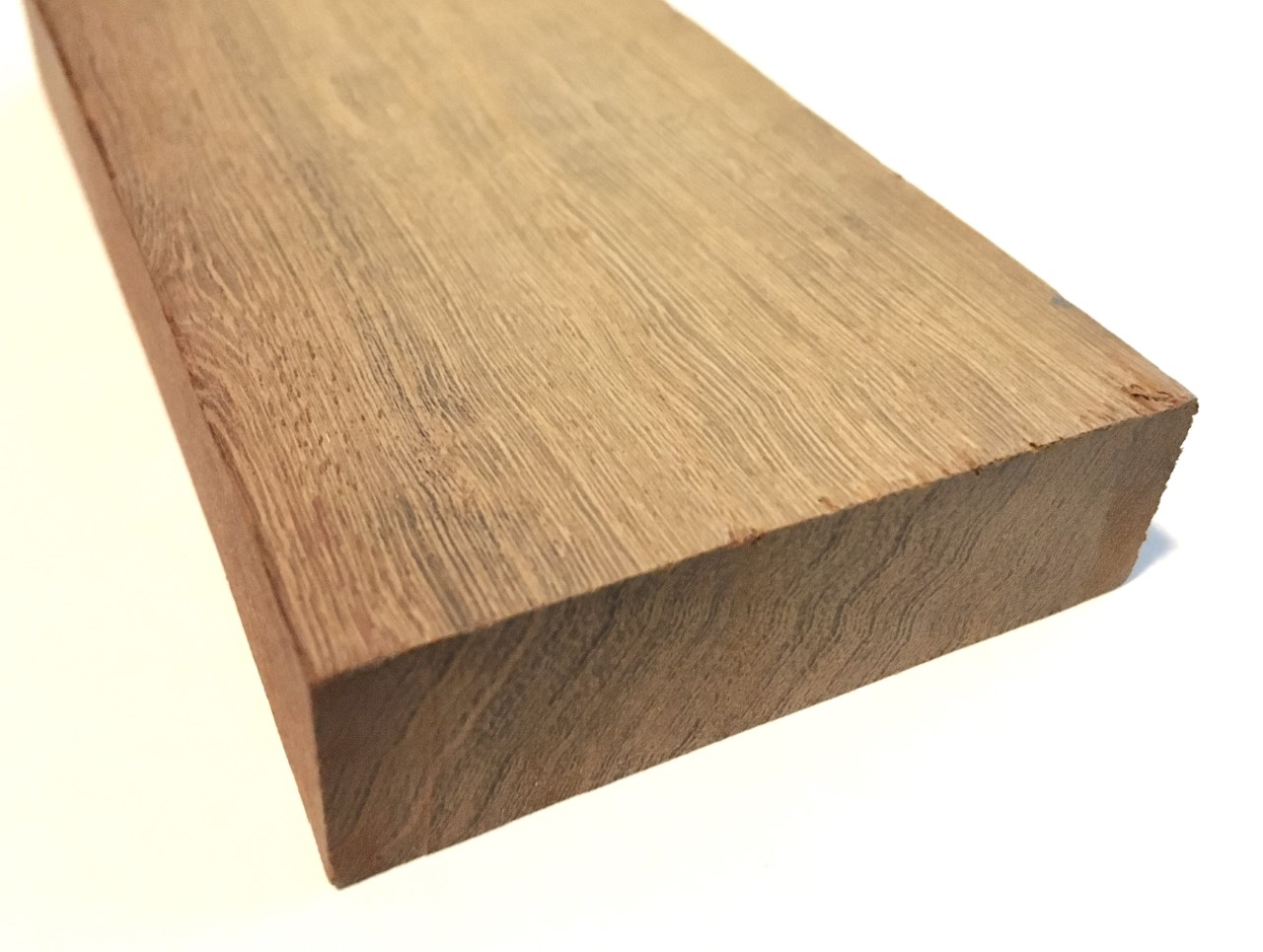
A specimen of Iroko wood

The timber is used for a variety of external and internal purposes including boat-building, domestic flooring, furniture and outdoor gates. From the late 1990s, it was used as part of the txalaparta, a Basque musical instrument constructed of wooden boards, due to its lively sound. Iroko is one of the traditional djembe woods. Iroko wood was the wood chosen for the pews in the Our Lady of Peace Basilica.

It is a very durable wood; iroko does not require regular treatment with oil or varnish when used outdoors, although it is very difficult to work with tools as it tends to splinter easily, and blunts tools very quickly.

In the UK there are no trade restrictions on the machining of this timber. The only reported adverse effects known to be caused by the dust from iroko are asthma, dermatitis and nettle rash.

== Cultural beliefs ==
The tree is feared in some cultures where it originates and hence is shunned or revered with offerings. Yoruba people believe that the tree possess an animating force/spirit (Olúwéré), and anybody who sees the 'Iroko-man' face to face becomes insane and speedily dies. According to the Yoruba, any man who cuts down any iroko tree causes devastating misfortune on himself and all of his family, although if they need to cut down the tree they can make a prayer afterwards to protect themselves.

They also claim that the spirit of the Iroko can be heard in houses which use iroko wood, as the spirit of the Iroko is trapped in the wood. In Nigeria the iroko wood is of much lower quality due to soil conditions as well as root-rot. Some Westerners refer to the wood as "poor man's teak".
