= Sorocea sarcocarpa =

Conservation status
- Endangered (IUCN 3.1)

Scientific classification
- Kingdom: Plantae
- Clade: Embryophytes
- Clade: Tracheophytes
- Clade: Angiosperms
- Clade: Eudicots
- Clade: Rosids
- Order: Rosales
- Family: Moraceae
- Genus: Sorocea
- Species: S. sarcocarpa

Binomial name
- Sorocea sarcocarpa Lanj. & Wess.Boer

Species of flowering plant

Sorocea sarcocarpa is a species of plant in the family Moraceae. It is endemic to Ecuador.
