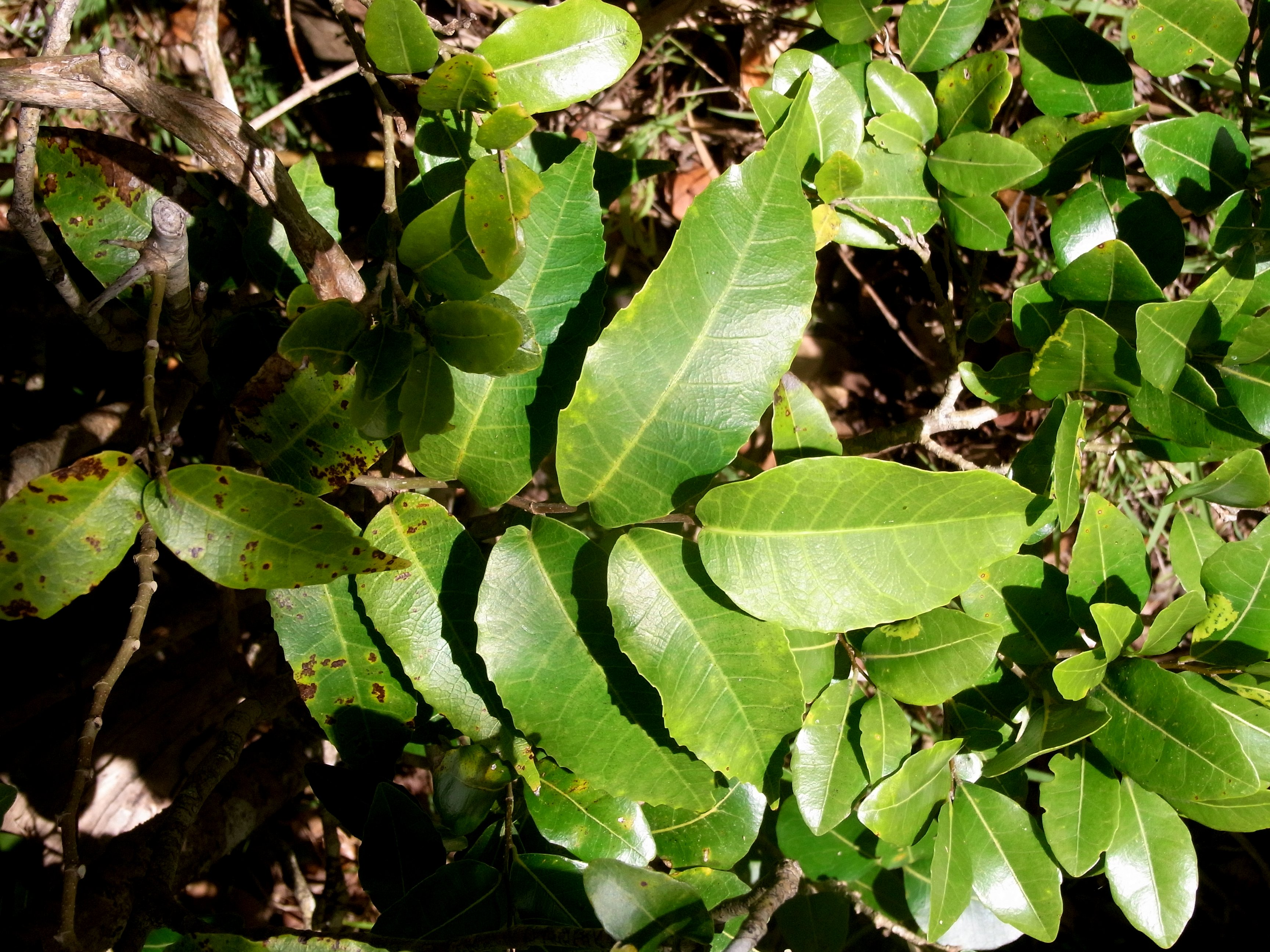
- Near Malabar-Kims at Lord Howe Island

Scientific classification
- Kingdom: Plantae
- Clade: Tracheophytes
- Clade: Angiosperms
- Clade: Eudicots
- Clade: Rosids
- Order: Rosales
- Family: Moraceae
- Genus: Malaisia
- Species: M. scandens
- Subspecies: M. s. subsp. megacarpa

Trinomial name
- Malaisia scandens subsp. megacarpa P.S.Green

Synonyms
- Trophis scandens subsp. megacarpa (P.S.Green,) P.S.Green

= Malaisia scandens subsp. megacarpa =

Subspecies of flowering plant

Malaisia scandens subsp. megacarpa is a flowering plant in the mulberry family. The subspecific epithet comes from the Greek mega ("big") and carpos ("fruit"), with reference to the larger fruits in this subspecies.

== Description ==
It is a rough-barked, woody climber. The alternate, leathery, oval leaves are usually 80–110 mm long and 40–50 mm wide. The male flowers are minute, occurring in cylindrical inflorescences up to 10 mm long, the female flowers in globular heads 4 mm across, appearing from July to October. The bright red fruits are 12 mm across.

== Distribution and habitat ==
The subspecies is endemic to Australia's subtropical Lord Howe Island in the Tasman Sea, where it is common in lowland forest.
