= Bagassa =

Conservation status
- Least Concern (IUCN 3.1)

Scientific classification
- Kingdom: Plantae
- Clade: Tracheophytes
- Clade: Angiosperms
- Clade: Eudicots
- Clade: Rosids
- Order: Rosales
- Family: Moraceae
- Tribe: Moreae
- Genus: Bagassa; Aubl.
- Species: B. guianensis

Binomial name
- Bagassa guianensis Aubl.

Synonyms
- Bagassa sagotiana Burch. ex Benth. & Hook.f.; Bagassa tiliifolia (Desv.) Benoist; Laurea tiliifolia Gaudich.; Piper tiliifolium Desv.

Genus of trees

Bagassa guianensis is a tree in the plant family Moraceae which is native to the Guianas and Brazil. It is valued as a timber tree and as a food tree for wildlife. The juvenile leaves are distinctly different in appearance from the mature leaves, and were once thought to belong to different species.

== Description ==
Bagassa guianensis is a large, latex-producing, dioecious, deciduous tree which reaches heights of up 45 metres (148 feet) and a diameter at breast height of 190 centimetres (75 inches). The leaves are deeply three-lobed in juveniles, but become entire as the tree matures. They are usually 6–22 cm (2 1/4–8 3/4 in) long, sometimes up to 30 cm (12 in) long, and 4–17 cm (1 1/2–6 3/4 in) wide (sometimes up to 23 cm (9 in) wide).

Male and female flowers are borne on separate inflorescences. Male inflorescences are arranged in a spike, which is 4–12 cm (1 1/2–4 3/4 in) long. Female inflorescences are arranged into a compact head which is 1 to 1.5 cm (3/8 to 5/8 in) in diameter. The infructescences are 2.5 to 3.5 cm (1 to 1 1/2 in) in diameter.

== Taxonomy ==
Bagassa is a monotypic genus—it includes only one species, B. guianensis. The genus was established in 1775 by French botanist Jean Baptiste Christophore Fusée Aublet in his description of the species. Aublet's description was based on juvenile leaves together with infructescences. Based on mature leaves and male inflorescences, French botanist Nicaise Auguste Desvaux described Piper tiliifolium in 1825 and Charles Gaudichaud-Beaupré described Laurea tiliifolia in 1844. Raymond Benoist transferred these to Bagassa as B. tiliifolia in 1933. In 1880 Louis Édouard Bureau described B. sagotiana based on mature leaves and female inflorescences. Plants with juvenile and adult foliage were thought to belong to different species until at least 1975; in his 1975 treatment of the Moraceae for the Flora of Suriname, Dutch systematist Cornelis Berg maintained B. guianensis and B. tiliifolia as separate species—the former with lobed juvenile foliage, the latter with the entire leaves of mature trees (although he maintained this distinction with reservations). This confusion would later be clarified through observations of live trees in the field.

=== Common names ===
Tatajuba is the other main name for this Bagassa species. In addition, the species is known locally as "cow wood", katowar, tuwue or yawahedan in Guyana. In Suriname is it known as gele bagasse, jawahedan, kauhoedoe or kaw-oedoe. In French Guiana it is called bacasse, bagasse, odon or odoun. In Maranhão state in Brazil it is called tatajuba or tareka'y; in Pará it is known as amaparana, taraiko'i or tatajuba; in Roraima it is called tatajuba.

== Distribution ==
Bagassa guianensis is found in Guyana, Suriname, French Guiana and the northern Amazon basin (in the states of Amapá, Pará, Maranhão and Roraima) with an apparently disjunct population in the southwestern states of Mato Grosso and Rondônia.

== Ecology ==
Bagassa guianensis is a "long-lived pioneer" that frequently established in second growth forests and tree-fall gaps.

Although the structure of B. guianensis flowers suggests bat-pollination, Berg suggested that they might be wind-pollinated since the trees were "tall and deciduous". Direct observation suggests that pollination is primarily by thrips, although the thrips themselves may be dispersed by wind. One study in Pará, Brazil, suggests that on average, seeds were produced by pollen that had travelled between 308 and 961 m (1,010 and 3,153 ft) from the male flowers that produced the pollen to the female flowers that were pollinated.

The seeds of B. guianensis are dispersed by a variety of animals including monkeys, birds, deer, rodents and tortoises.

== Uses ==
Bagassa guianensis, commercially well known as Tatajuba, is a valuable timber species and is intensively exploited. The infructescences are edible.

== Wood ==
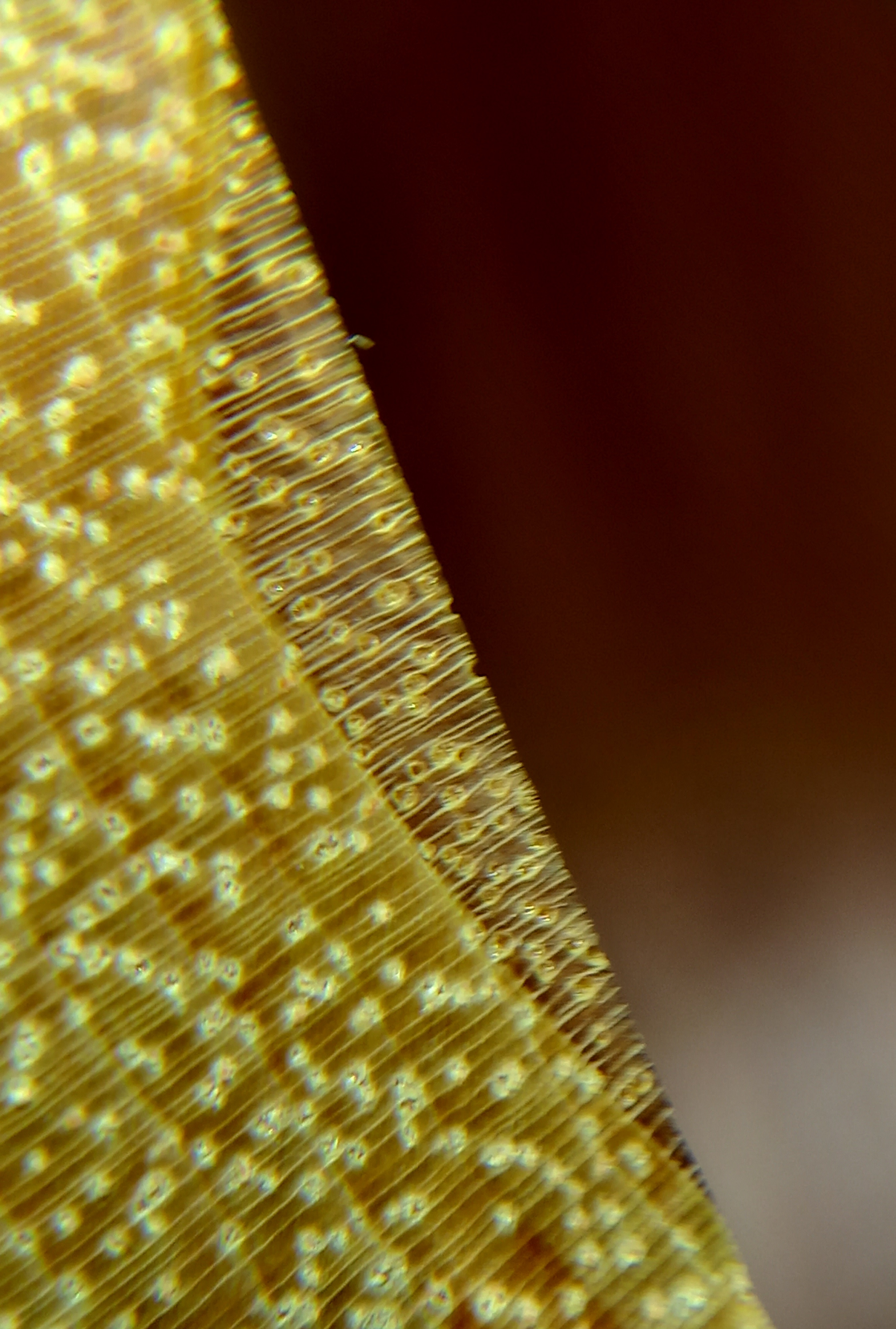
Cross section of a Tatajuba wood

Tatajuba wood is characterized by a freshly cut heartwood ranging from bright yellow to golden yellow, which darkens over time to golden or reddish brown when exposed to light. The pale yellow-white sapwood is clearly distinct from the heartwood. The wood commonly displays an interlocked grain with a medium, uniform texture and natural luster, while quartersawn surfaces often show a broad striped figure similar to the ribbon stripe of Sapele. It is diffuse-porous, with large pores, common tyloses, and vasicentric to lozenge-shaped axial parenchyma. It is considered durable to very durable in resistance to decay and insect attack, although it has relatively poor weathering performance outdoors.

The wood generally works well, though interlocked grain may cause tear-out during machining and its silica content can dull tools more rapidly. Tatajuba also glues, turns, and finishes well, and has no characteristic odor. It is used for construction, furniture, and boat-building.
