= Milicia regia =

Conservation status
- Vulnerable (IUCN 3.1)

Scientific classification
- Kingdom: Plantae
- Clade: Tracheophytes
- Clade: Angiosperms
- Clade: Eudicots
- Clade: Rosids
- Order: Rosales
- Family: Moraceae
- Genus: Milicia
- Species: M. regia

Binomial name
- Milicia regia (A.Chev.) C.C.Berg

Synonyms
- Chlorophora regia A.Chev. Maclura regia (A.Chev.) Corner

Species of tree

Milicia regia is a species of tropical tree in the family Moraceae. It grows in a belt on the west coast of Africa that extends from the Gambia to Ghana. It is threatened by habitat loss and logging.

== Description ==
Milicia regia has a wide, rounded dark green crown. The trunk is tall and straight, with smooth, reddish-brown bark. The leaves are borne on short petioles and are ovate, dark green and up to 7 centimetres (2 3/4 inches) long. They are arranged alternately along the twig and have 7 to 11 lateral nerves and untoothed margins. Male and female flowers are borne on separate trees. Male trees are taller and more slender than female trees and start flowering first. The catkins are borne in the axils of the leaves. The male tree has long catkins that can extend to 20 cm (8 in) in length, and the flowers in the upper part of the crown come out earlier than those further down. The female catkins are produced on the upper parts of the crown and are green and up to 2 cm (1 in) in length, with protruding styles. The flowers are wind pollinated and by the time the fruits have ripened in five to six weeks, they have turned yellow. They fall from the tree and the many small seeds are dispersed by the birds, mammals and insects that feed on the fruit.

== Distribution and habitat ==
Milicia regia is found (from west to east) in the Gambia, Senegal, Guinea-Bissau, Guinea, Sierra Leone, Liberia, Ivory Coast, and Ghana. It grows in the high forest zone, in savanna woodland, and in valleys and riverside habitats, but it needs well-drained soil.

== Uses ==
The timber is strong and durable, with logs being up to a metre (yard) in diameter. It is yellow-brown to brown with a coarse texture and darker veins. It is resistant to termites and fungal attack, and damage by wood-boring insects is limited to the sapwood.

Milicia regia is one of two trees known as "odum" in Ghana, the other being the closely related Milicia excelsa. The timber from both trees is known as "iroko" and is used in construction, joinery, furniture making and the creation of mortars for grinding food. Attempts to grow the tree in plantations have been unsuccessful because the buds are attacked by the psyllid fly Phytolyma lata. The larvae of this insect create galls that weaken the young tree, causing dieback and even death, with seedlings being particularly affected. Natural regeneration of the tree is poor and because large numbers of trees are being felled each year, its future for commercial timber production is in doubt.
