= Maclura brasiliensis =

Conservation status
- Least Concern (IUCN 3.1)

Scientific classification
- Kingdom: Plantae
- Clade: Tracheophytes
- Clade: Angiosperms
- Clade: Eudicots
- Clade: Rosids
- Order: Rosales
- Family: Moraceae
- Genus: Maclura
- Species: M. brasiliensis

Binomial name
- Maclura brasiliensis (Mart.) Endl.

Synonyms
- Broussonetia brasiliensis Mart.; Chlorophora brasiliensis Standl. ex J.F.Macbr.; Chlorophora scandens Standl. & L.O.Williams; Ioxylon pomiferum Raf. var. glaberrimum Kuntze

Species of tree

Maclura brasiliensis is a species of flowering plant in the family Moraceae. It is a scrambling shrub or tree native to Bolivia, Peru, southeastern Brazil, Honduras, and Venezuela.
