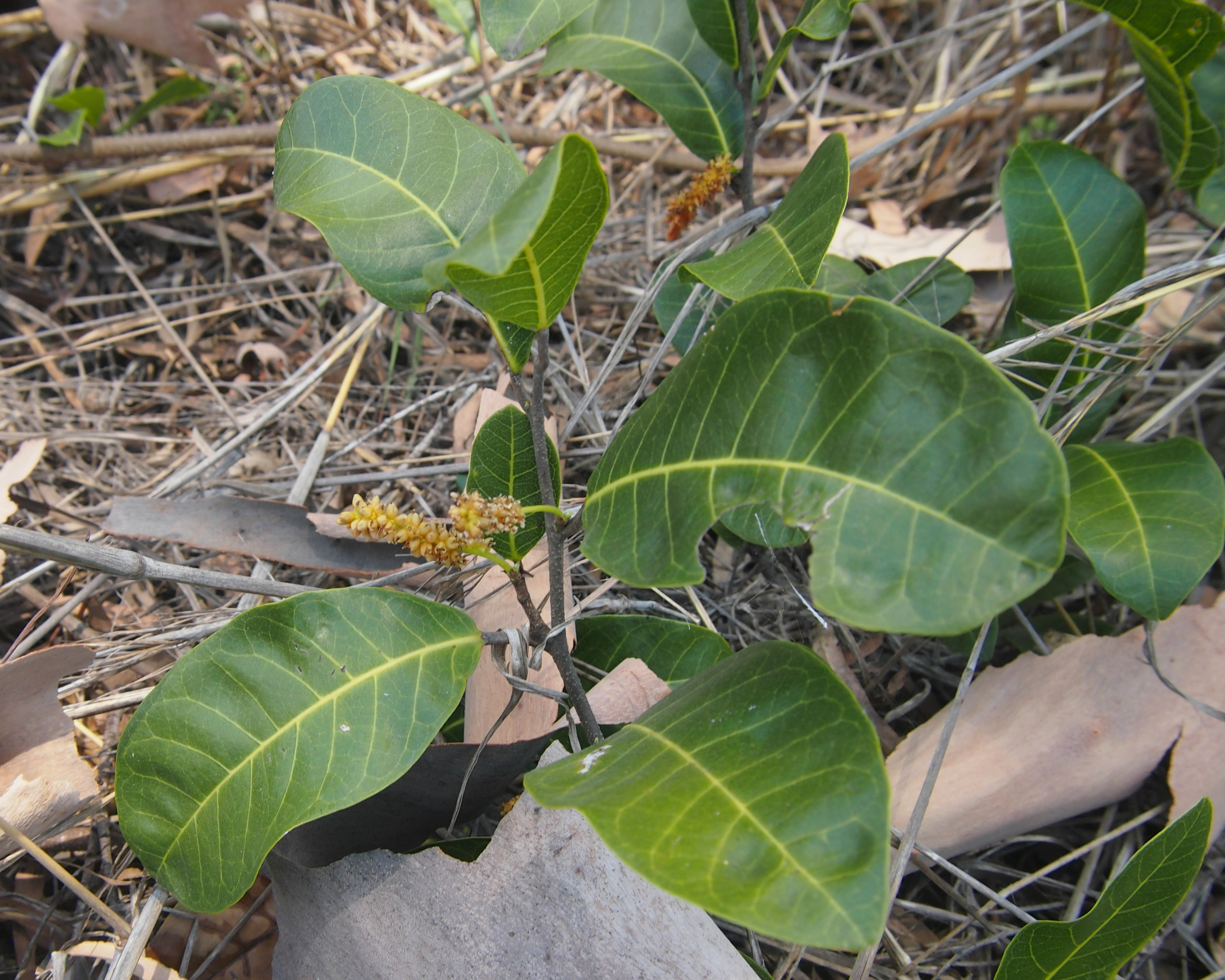

Scientific classification
- Kingdom: Plantae
- Clade: Tracheophytes
- Clade: Angiosperms
- Clade: Eudicots
- Clade: Rosids
- Order: Rosales
- Family: Moraceae
- Tribe: Moreae
- Genus: Trophis; P.Browne (1756)

Species
- 5; see text

Synonyms
- Bucephalon L. (1753); Caturus Lour. (1790), nom. illeg.; Cephalotrophis Blume (1856); Dumartroya Gaudich. (1848); Skutchia Pax & K.Hoffm. (1937)

= Trophis =

Genus of flowering plants

Trophis is a genus in the plant family Moraceae which includes five species native to the tropical Americas, ranging from Mexico through Central America and the Caribbean to Peru and northern Brazil. It is dioecious, with male and female flowers borne on separate plants.

Phylogenetic studies suggested that the genus as formerly circumscribed was polyphyletic, and several species formerly placed here have now been placed in other genera.

== Species ==
Five species are currently accepted.

- Trophis cuspidata Lundell
- Trophis involucrata W.C.Burger
- Trophis mexicana (Liebm.) Bureau
- Trophis noraminervae Cuevas & Carvajal
- Trophis racemosa (L.) Urb.
