= Greensword =

Greensword is a common name for several Hawaiian plants in the genus Argyroxiphium, and may refer to:

- Argyroxiphium grayanum, endemic to Maui
- Argyroxiphium virescens, an extinct plant endemic to Maui

== See also ==
- Stephen Greensword (born 1943), English cricketer
