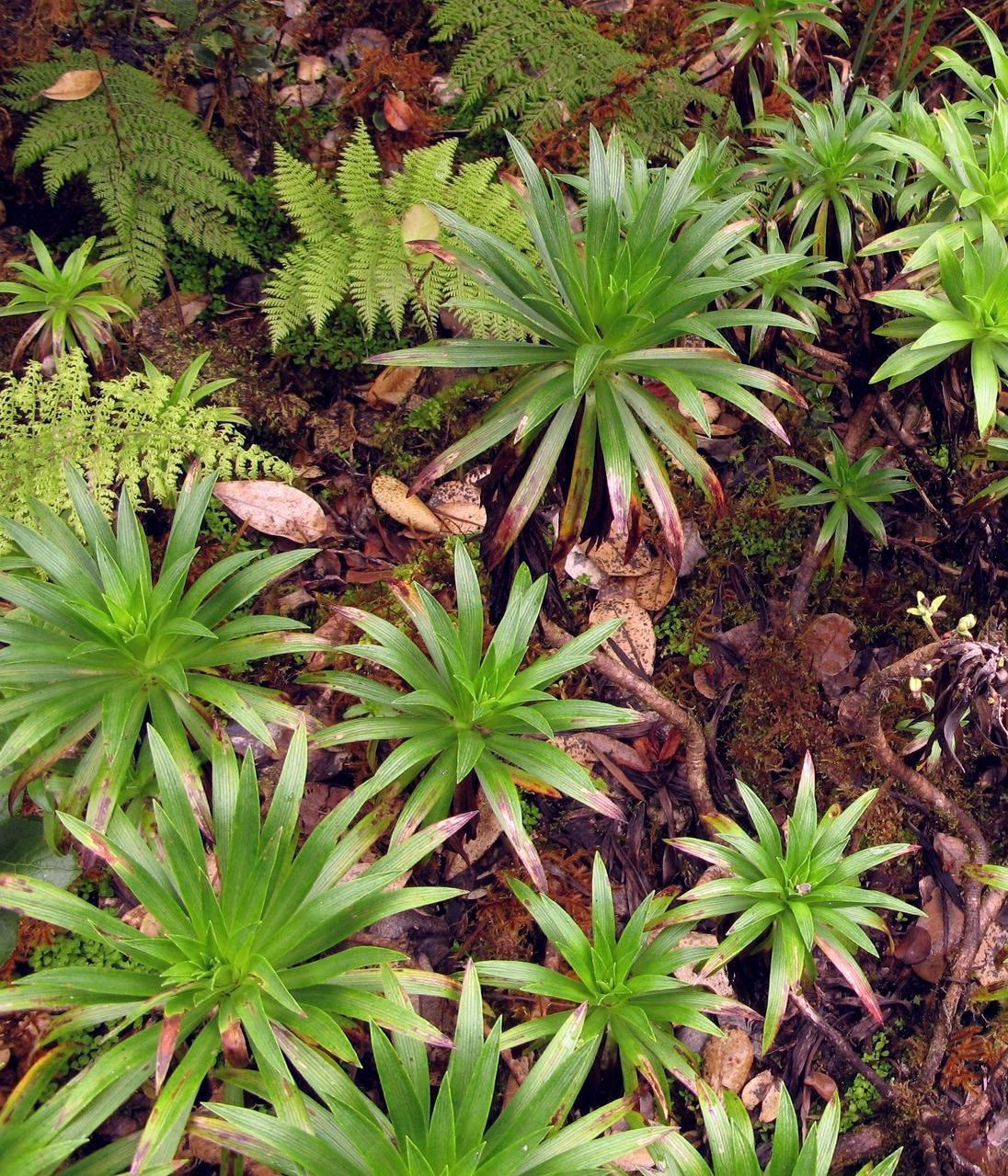

Conservation status
- Critically Imperiled (NatureServe)

Scientific classification
- Kingdom: Plantae
- Clade: Tracheophytes
- Clade: Angiosperms
- Clade: Eudicots
- Clade: Asterids
- Order: Asterales
- Family: Asteraceae
- Genus: Argyroxiphium
- Species: A. grayanum

Binomial name
- Argyroxiphium grayanum (Hillebr.) O.Deg.

= Argyroxiphium grayanum =

Species of plant

Argyroxiphium grayanum, commonly known as the greensword, is a species of flowering plant in the family Asteraceae, and a member of the silversword alliance, a group of over 50 species which are diverse in morphology and habitat but are genetically closely related.

The silversword alliance provides a convincing natural case study in evolution by adaptive radiation, with the greensword representing one extreme of the genus' plasticity. Some Argyroxiphium, including the well-known Haleakala and Mauna Kea silverswords, live in harsh alpine desert-like conditions of heat, sun, wind, and aridity, and are drought-adapted plants capable of storing water as a gel in leaf structures which are normally air pockets in other plants. However, A. grayanum is a bog plant adapted to very different conditions – excessive moisture, lack of regular sunlight, and cool temperatures, and its leaves are non-succulent like those of the related genus Dubautia.

== Description ==
Argyroxiphium grayanum is a perennial plant endemic to the island of Maui in Hawaii. Its growth form is typically a low shrub up to 2 m high, erect, with an erect single-stemmed monocarpic rosette shape, though in the interior of bogs it typically grows as a dwarf shrub under 30 cm high. It has green, 5–11-nerved, narrowly elliptic-ligulate leaves which are broadest above the middle. It occurs only in and around montane cloud forest bogs at elevations ranging from about 1,200 to 2,050 m. The sites receive from about 300 to over 1,000 cm precipitation per year. It is most abundant along the upper rim of Kīpahulu Valley on East Maui and near the summit of Puʻu Kukui on West Maui. The latter region is also home to a related species, the ʻEke silversword (A. caliginis). Despite their close relationship and shared habitat, the two species differ in several ways beyond the coloring of their lance-shaped leaves, with silversword possessing a distinctive sheen.

Most Argyroxiphium species generally produce one inflorescence, after which the plant dies. Neither A. grayanum nor the sympatric ʻEke silversword (A. caliginis) follow this pattern in a strict sense. Both species flower infrequently compared to the mass flowerings of the Haleakala silversword, and produce multiple branches such that only some rosettes of a given plant die back in any given year. A. caliginis additionally reproduces by way of runners or prostrate stems which root and spread.

== Other greensword species ==
Another greensword species A. virescens, was formerly found on East Maui only, but is now apparently extinct.

== Adaptive radiation and the silversword alliance ==
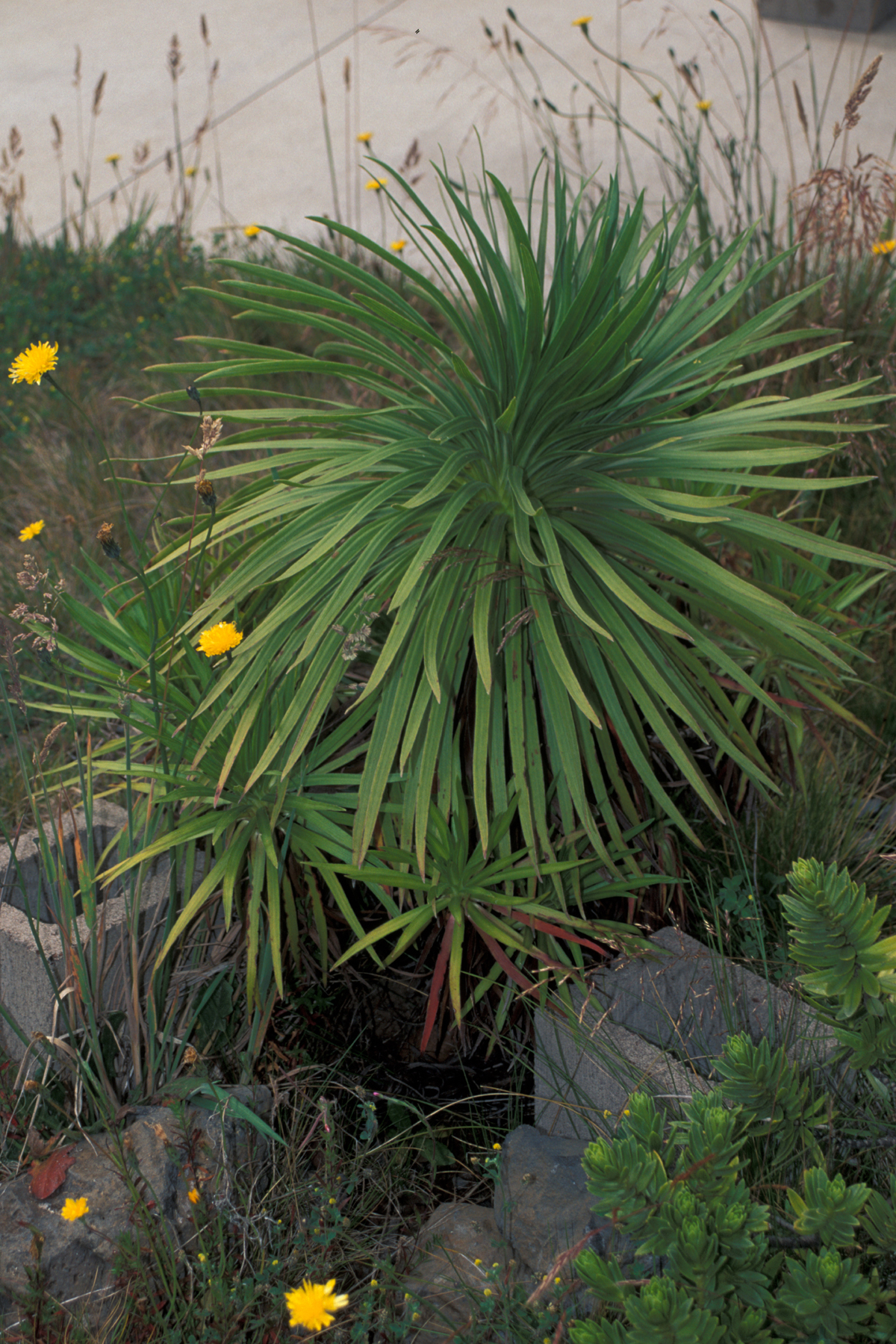

Based on biosystematics and molecular studies, all of the silversword alliance species are thought to have evolved from a single ancestor, related to the tarweed (Carlquistia muirii) found in western North America. That several spontaneous hybrids have been observed supports this hypothesis. If true, the adaptive radiation of the tarweed/silversword/greensword into extremely diverse morphologies and habitats is an extraordinary case history of evolution.
