= Argyroxiphium virescens × sandwicense subsp. macrocephalum =

Argyroxiphium virescens x sandwicense subsp. macrocephalum

Scientific classification
- Kingdom: Plantae
- Clade: Tracheophytes
- Clade: Angiosperms
- Clade: Eudicots
- Clade: Asterids
- Order: Asterales
- Family: Asteraceae
- Subtribe: Madiinae
- Genus: Argyroxiphium
- Species: A. virescens × A. sandwicense subsp. sandwicense

Hybrid species of flowering plant

Argyroxiphium virescens × sandwicense subsp. macrocephalum, commonly known as the Pu'u 'Alaea greensword is a hybrid species of silversword plant in the family Asteraceae, and is a part of the silversword alliance. It is a hybrid between two taxons of silversword plant in the genus Argyroxiphium, being the presumably extinct Argyroxiphium virescens, and a subspecies, Argyroxiphium sandwicense subsp. macrocephalum. The hybrid species was discovered in 1989, when an individual flowered, which revealed hybridization features of two species of silversword. It is endemic to East Maui, primarily near the location of Pu’u Alaea (from which it was named), where it is seen growing beside other Argyroxiphium species. The population of the hybrid species is unknown, but is likely under threat of feral goats, and pigs that plague silversword plants.

== Description ==
The Pu'u 'Alaea greensword is morphologically similar to Argyroxiphium sandwicense subsp. macrocephalum. It is most easily distinguished by the color of the leaves. Pu'u 'Alaea greensword leaves are less hairy, and as a result, are greener than the non-hybrid species.
