= Argyroxiphium × kai =

Scientific classification
- Kingdom: Plantae
- Clade: Tracheophytes
- Clade: Angiosperms
- Clade: Eudicots
- Clade: Asterids
- Order: Asterales
- Family: Asteraceae
- Genus: Argyroxiphium
- Species: A. × kai

Binomial name
- Argyroxiphium × kai (C.N.Forbes) D.D.Keck

Synonyms
- Argyroxiphium caliginis var. kai C.N.Forbes

Species of flowering plant

Argyroxiphium × kai, commonly known as the Kai silversword, is a hybrid species of silversword plant in the family Asteraceae, and is a part of the silversword alliance. The name derived from the Hawaiian word "kai", which translates to "sea". It was described by David D. Keck in 1936. Argyroxiphium × kai is a natural hybrid between Argyroxiphium caliginis and Argyroxiphium grayanum, so the name Argyroxiphium calignis × grayanum can also apply, but is generally less common. It is endemic to Maui, Hawaii, where it grows between other Argyroxiphium species, primarily the two species that hybridized between each other. The population of the hybrid species is unknown, although it is likely that it may be endangered, or unstable due to invasive feral goats and pigs in its natural habitat. No conservation status has been assigned to Argyroxiphium × kai by the IUCN Red List, for it is a hybrid species, so a conservation status does not apply.
