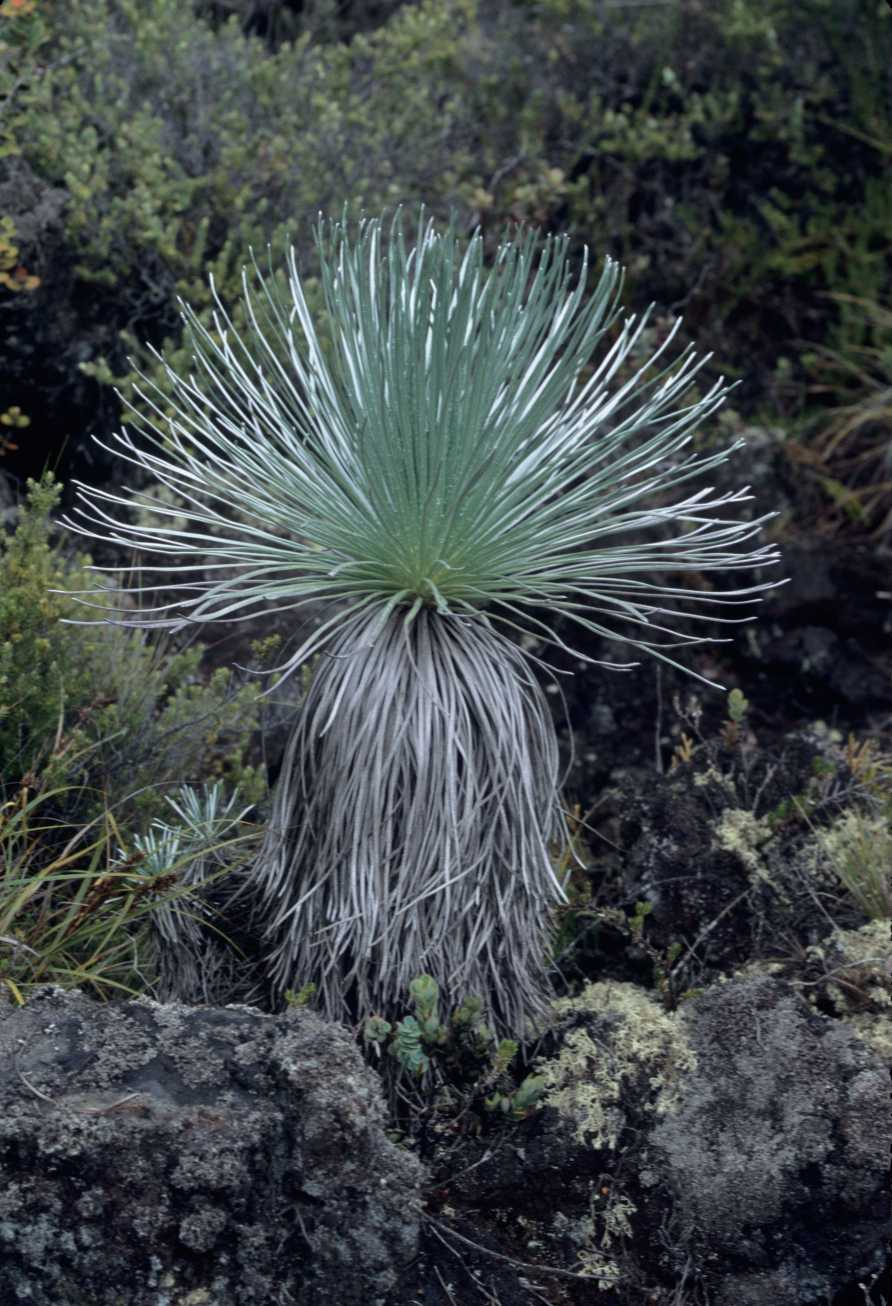

Conservation status
- Endangered (ESA)

- Critically Endangered (IUCN 3.1)

Scientific classification
- Kingdom: Plantae
- Clade: Embryophytes
- Clade: Tracheophytes
- Clade: Spermatophytes
- Clade: Angiosperms
- Clade: Eudicots
- Clade: Asterids
- Order: Asterales
- Family: Asteraceae
- Genus: Argyroxiphium
- Species: A. kauense

Binomial name
- Argyroxiphium kauense (Rock & M.Neal) O.Deg. & I.Deg.
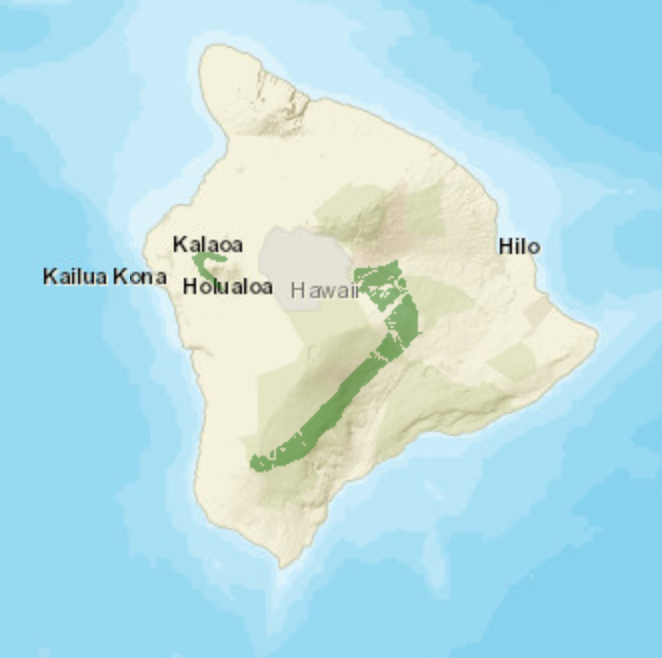
- Distribution of the Mauna Loa silversword on the island of Hawaiʻi

= Argyroxiphium kauense =

Species of plant

The Mauna Loa silversword, Argyroxiphium kauense, or Kaʻū silversword, is a rare species of flowering plant in the aster family. It is endemic to the eastern and southern slopes of Mauna Loa on the island of Hawaiʻi. A. kauense occurs in mountainous shrublands, bogs, and open mesic forest. The species is managed by the National Park Service and Hawaiʻi State Department of Forestry and Wildlife. It is a federally listed endangered species of the United States. There are three known populations remaining, for a total of fewer than 1000 individuals.

== Description ==
The Mauna Loa silversword is a primarily monocarpic, single-stemmed rosette shrub. The shrub consists of a spherical rosette of many silvery, dagger-shaped leaves. The silver reflection seen on the leaves is caused by the dense, felty leaf hairs that help to lower the UV absorption of the plant. The leaves are long and narrow, so when older leaves fail to fall off, they form a skirt around the stem of the silverword; the skirt then acts as protection from freezing.

The trunks grow vertically, compared to smaller forms in the other species of the silversword. The Mauna Loa silversword can reach up to 1.8 meters (5.91 feet) in height and produce multiple flowering branches. Each rosette, or branch of the plant, can grow for 20 to 30 years and may reach 40–70 cm (15.7–31.5 inches) before flowering and producing dry fruit. Each fruit contains a single seed. As a monocarpic shrub, the silversword flowers only once, bears fruit, and then dies. The silversword is self-incompatible, meaning individuals are not capable of pollinating themselves.

== Life history ==
The Mauna Loa silversword is a monoecious plant that has a lifespan of 10 to 30 years. At the end of its life, the plant grows a tall flowering stalk and blooms. The stalk can be up to 2.74 meters (9 feet) in height. It is in the sunflower family, so the plant's stalk is made up of as many as 300 individual flowers, and each flower has 300 flower heads, for an average maximum of 90,000 offspring. Very few seeds successfully disperse, negatively impacting the already-low population growth rate. After a few weeks, the plant dies as a part of a monocarpic cycle. The blooms typically occur in August through September.

== Ecology ==
=== Range ===
The ancestor of A. kauense came to Hawaiʻi approximately 5 million years ago, where it underwent an adaptive radiation, leading to the 30 species within the silversword alliance. The Mauna Loa silversword is most closely related to the Mauna Kea silversword. The Mauna Loa silversword is found 5000–8000 feet in elevation on volcanic cinder soil on Mauna Loa, an active volcano on the island of Hawaii.

=== Habitat ===
The Mauna Loa silversword grows in volcanic cinder soil. Volcanic soil tends to be high in inorganic nutrients and holds water well because of the volcanic ash content. Mauna Loa has an annual rainfall of 50 cm – 80 cm (19.5 inches – 31.2 inches), and an annual mean temperature of 11 °C (51.8 °F). At higher elevations, they are more likely to encounter frost. This is a constraining factor compared to lower elevations; trunks can grow taller at lower elevations. It can grow in moist areas, like wet ʻōhiʻa forests, and dry areas of smooth lava, which lie within shrubby ʻōhiʻa forests.

=== Ecosystem interactions ===
Yellow-faced bees are the Mauna Loa silversword's main pollinator. The bees are native to Hawaii and are threatened by predatory social insects like invasive argentine ants.

There is a potential symbiotic relationship between Mauna Loa silverswords and sphagnum moss beds that grow near the plants. More seedlings were found within 2 meters (6.5 feet) of moss beds than outside the range in the Upper Waiākea population. The presence of the moss beds is important for germination, and seems necessary for the plant to survive in a bog habitat.

== Conservation ==
The Mauna Loa silversword was listed under the Endangered Species Act as endangered wherever it is found on April 7, 1993. This was 18 years after a petition from the Smithsonian was filed in 1975. In 2003, the IUCN listed the species as critically endangered on their Red List.

=== Population size and location, past and current ===
Before becoming threatened, Mauna Loa silverswords were estimated to number in the "several thousand". They mostly lived in both wet ʻōhiʻa forests and in dry, shrubbier ʻōhiʻa forests on the slopes of Mauna Loa. Just prior to its listing, in 1990, there were about 400 plants. Currently, there are 3 wild populations of Mauna Loa Silversword found at locations in Kapāpala, Waiākea, and Kahuku, with a total population of 752 plants. They exist in a fraction of their former habitat that would have encircled the volcano. Additionally, there are an estimated 35,000 that have been outplanted into captivity at these locations. These outplanted silverswords have been observed bearing fruit when they have been replanted into their native habitats. Conservation scientists noted that the outplanting in these areas was successful.

=== Major threats ===
The largest threats to this species at the time of its listing were given as its limited gene pool and low reproductive capability. Mauna Loa Silverswords must be pollinated by a separate plant to produce offspring. This means that it depends on other blooming individuals being around it, requiring a dense population for the species to reproduce successfully. However, each silversword blooms only once in their lifetime before dying, which further limits the reproductive growth of the species.

Other threats identified by the USFWS were those of grazing by feral cows, pigs, and Mouflon sheep. These animals eat silversword, and those plants that survive produce fewer offspring. This is because grazing reduces the size of their blooming stalks. The small populations of the Mauna Loa silversword also make it vulnerable to sudden events that could wipe it out, such as fires or lava flows.

Modern fencing has mostly eliminated the threat of grazing animals. While research has also found the population to be more diverse than originally feared, several new threats face the Mauna Loa Silversword as of 2020. These include climate change, the loss of native pollinators, and predation by rats.

=== Conservation efforts ===
2 years after the species was listed as endangered under the ESA, a recovery plan for it was established on November 21, 1995. The recovery plan stated that downlisting of the species to threatened would occur when the following conditions were met: That there were at least 10 populations of at least 2,000 individuals, when their population were increasing, the populations were protected from grazers, and the populations were genetically diverse. No critical habitat was initially provided. This was because the USFWS feared that designating habitat would make it easier for people to locate and harm the plant. Later, on July 2, 2003, certain areas of Hawaii were designated as critical habitat for a number of species. Some of those areas on the southeastern slopes of Mauna Loa contained populations of Mauna Loa silversword.

This recovery plan was updated on August 7, 2019, as the number of required populations for downlisting was set at 5–10. The need for population increase changed to population stability for 10 years. It also broadened the requirements for protections against grazers to being against all threats. A delisting criteria was also written about for the first time. The conditions for the delisting plan require that all of the previous criteria for downlisting have been met. The additional rules are that the population has been stable for 20 years, and that the Mauna Loa silversword no longer needs specific protection. The five main points of this recovery plan are to:

1. Protect and manage existing populations
2. Develop a research program on the ecology of the Ka'u Silversword
3. Re-establish the Ka'u Silversword in areas of former abundance
4. Enhance current populations
5. Periodically reevaluate recovery objectives

While no Species Status Assessment has been performed, three five-year reviews of the status of the Mauna Loa silversword have taken place since its initial listing. The most recent one was published on September 30, 2020. A highlighted discovery was of differences between the plants living in wet forests as compared to the drier ones. This suggested the potential for the emergence of two distinct species. It also highlighted new threats to the species since its initial listing, such as climate change shifting their available habitat. Other factors were the loss of native pollinators and predation by rats.

The review also highlighted positive news for the species' recovery though. For example, new research had found that the populations were much more diverse than feared. Most of these populations are also now fenced. This will protect them against the grazing animals which were responsible for their past decline. Finally, it set new research goals of identifying areas where new plants could be grown, as well as studying the effect of the loss of native pollinators.
