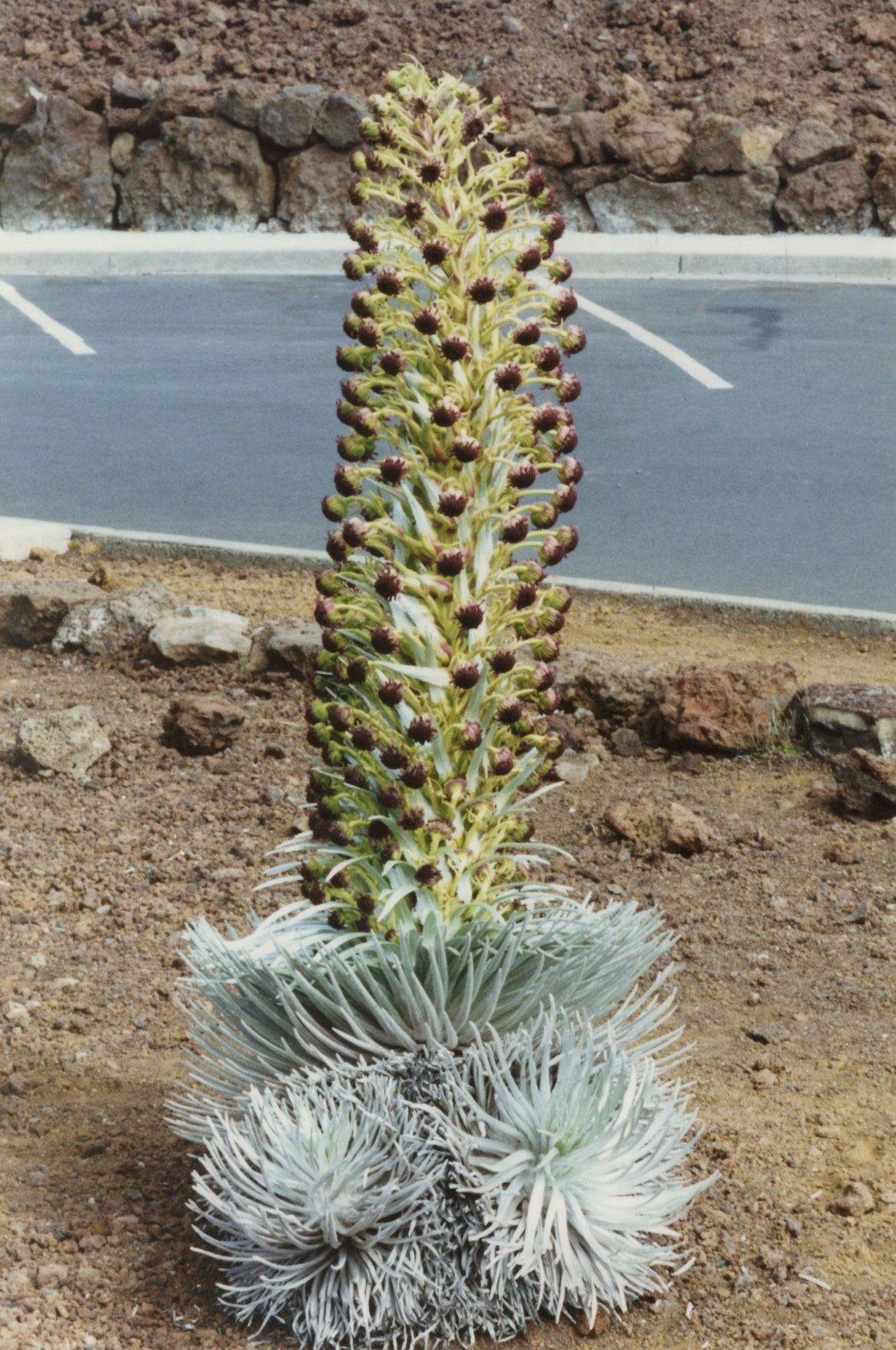
- Haleakalā silversword

Scientific classification
- Kingdom: Plantae
- Clade: Tracheophytes
- Clade: Angiosperms
- Clade: Eudicots
- Clade: Asterids
- Order: Asterales
- Family: Asteraceae
- Subfamily: Asteroideae
- Tribe: Madieae
- Subtribe: Madiinae
- Genus: Argyroxiphium; DC.

Synonyms
- Argyrophyton Hook.

= Argyroxiphium =

Genus of plants

Argyroxiphium is a small genus of plants in the family Asteraceae. Its members are known by the common names silversword or greensword due to their long, narrow leaves and the silvery hairs on some species. The silverswords belong to a larger radiation of over 30 species, including the physically different genera Dubautia and Wilkesia. This grouping is often referred to as the silversword alliance. Botanist P. H. Raven referred to this radiation as "the best example of adaptive radiation in plants".

== Description ==
Species in Argyroxiphium are perennial, rosette-forming shrubs. They may consist of a single large rosette or a collection of several rosettes. In all Argyroxiphium species, long, narrow leaves contain interstitial gels hypothesized to function as water storage. For some species, leaves are covered with trichomes that provide protection from frost and create the plants' signature silver sheen.

A silversword rosette grows for at least five years before flowering, though some species grow for up to 90 years before initiating the bolting process. For monocarpic individuals with a single rosette, this ends in the death of the plant, though some individuals are polycarpic. The flowering stalks may be up to 1.5 metres (4.9 feet) tall, and are composed of up to 600 capitulae. These flower heads range in diameter from 1 cm (0.39 in) to 6 cm (2.4 in) and consist of a ring of pistillate ray florets around 30 to 600 disk florets. The corollae vary in color from wine red to yellow or white. Because they are self-incompatible and require cross-pollination by insects, many plants must flower at the same time in relatively close proximity to set seed. A significant population must exist for enough individuals to flower simultaneously and allow pollination to occur. The single-seeded fruits are usually dispersed by wind.

Despite their different appearances, silverswords are very closely related to the genus Dubautia. Sympatric species in Argyroxiphium and Dubautia often naturally produce fertile hybrids that run the gamut of morphological characteristics from the two genera. Together, Argyroxiphium, Dubautia, and Wilkesia make up the silversword alliance.

== Evolution ==
The evolutionary roots of Argyroxiphium are the tarweeds in subtribe Madiinae. DNA analysis has revealed that silverswords form a clade within the Californian tarweed lineage. The relation is also physically evident—silversword capitulae and the flowers of Californian tarweeds both include sticky bracts that provide adhesion to birds for seed dispersal. It is hypothesized that an individual plant from the Californian tarweeds was spread first to Kauaʻi, then spread to the other islands and developed into the silversword alliance.

== Distribution ==
Silverswords are endemic to Hawaiʻi and occur only on the islands of Maui and Hawaiʻi. They grow primarily over 1,200 m (3,900 ft) above sea level in bogs, alpine shrublands, or wet shrublands. A. sandwichense is able to grow at high altitudes between 2,125 m (6,972 ft) and 3,750 m (12,300 ft) on cinder and lava with relatively little rainfall. The Haleakalā silversword (A sandwicense ssp. macrocephalum) is constrained to Haleakalā on Maui while the Mauna Kea silversword (A. sandwicense ssp. sandwicense) is specific to Mauna Kea on Hawaiʻi. Each of the other species is found primarily at lower altitudes with much higher annual rainfall.

== Conservation ==
The Mauna Loa or Kaʻū silversword (A. kauense) has been classified as critically endangered and the Mauna Kea and Halekalā silverswords (A. sandwichense) have been classified as endangered in the IUCN Red List. Direct damage from humans and from ungulate browsing have significantly damaged silversword populations, but dedicated management efforts have resulted in successful conservation of some species. In particular, the Haleakalā silversword population reached a low of approximately 4,000 plants in the 1920s, but rebounded to over 6,500 individuals by 1970. On the other hand, the Mauna Kea silversword population was composed of approximately 50 naturally occurring individuals and 500 outplanted individuals in 1999. The East Maui greensword (A. virescens) is apparently extinct, but in 1989 plants were discovered that appear to be hybrids between it and the Haleakalā silversword. The hybrid is known as the Pu'u 'Alaea greensword.

== Species ==
Accepted species

- Argyroxiphium caliginis C.N.Forbes – ʻEke silversword
- Argyroxiphium grayanum (Hillebr.) O. Deg. – greensword
- Argyroxiphium × kai D.D.Keck (A. caliginis × A. grayanum)
- Argyroxiphium kauense (Rock & M.Neal) O.Deg. & I.Deg. – Mauna Loa or Kaʻū silversword
- Argyroxiphium sandwicense DC. – silversword
  - Argyroxiphium sandwicense subsp. sandwicense DC. – Mauna Kea silversword
  - Argyroxiphium sandwicense subsp. macrocephalum (A.Gray) Meyrat – Haleakalā silversword
- Argyroxiphium virescens Hillebr. – East Maui greensword (extinct)

Formerly included

now in Wilkesia

- A. gymnoxiphium – Wilkesia gymnoxiphium

== Gallery ==
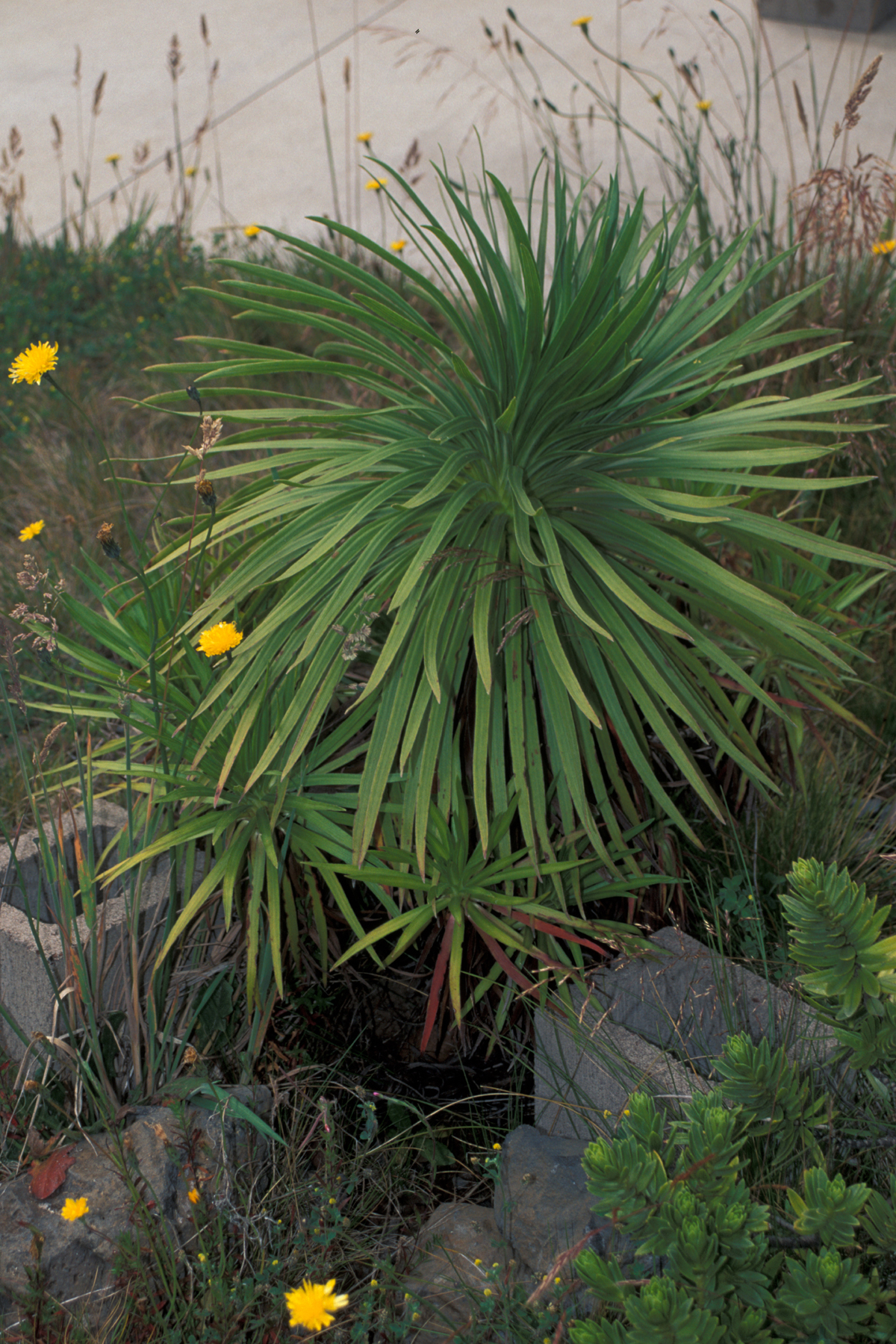
Greensword

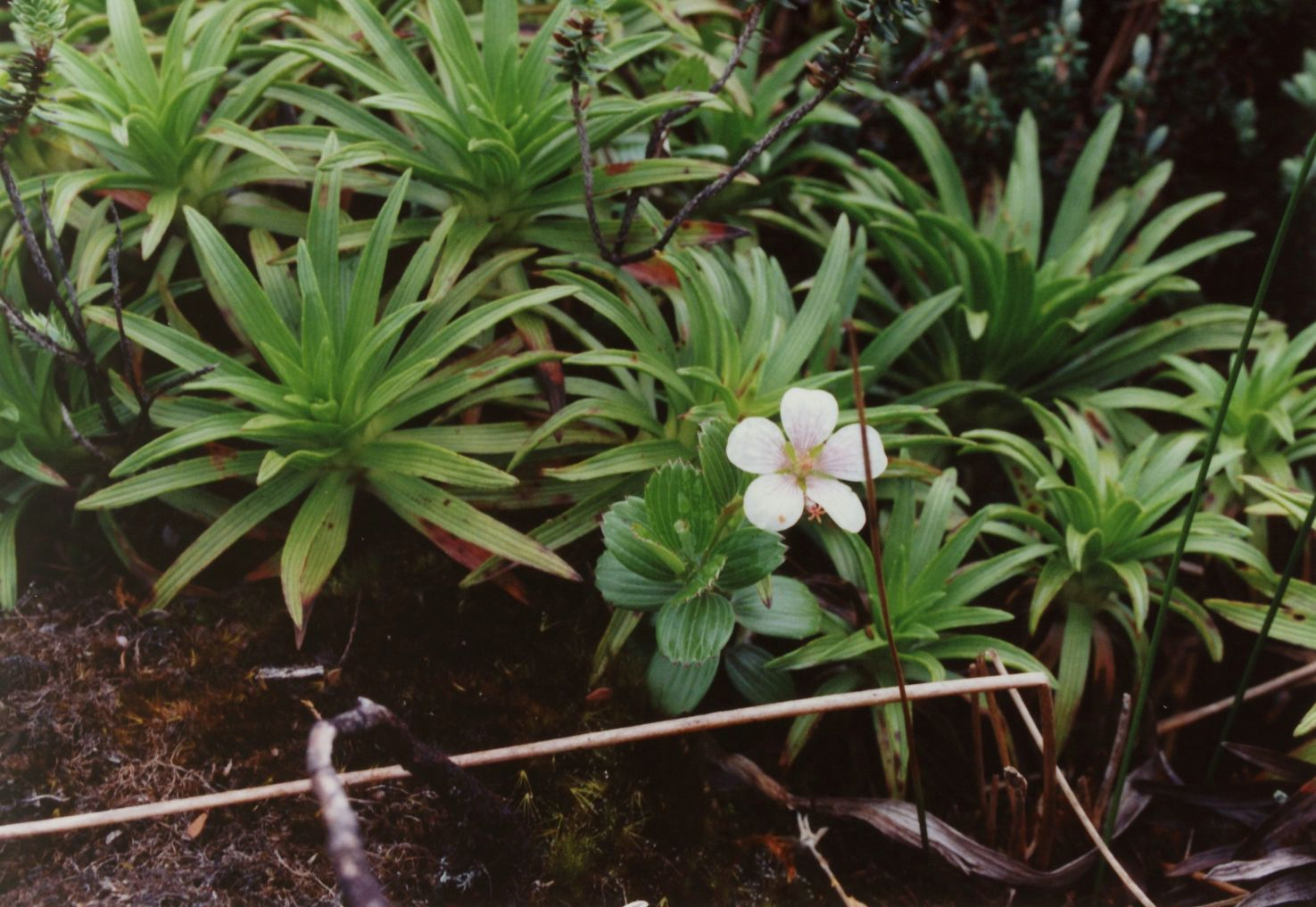
Greensword, Puʻu Kukui bog

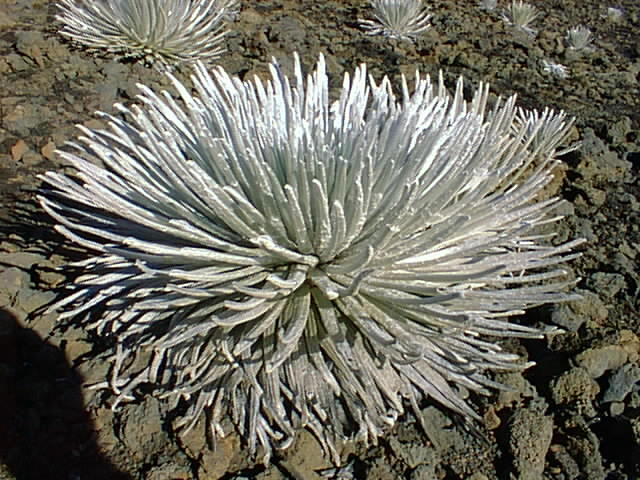
Haleakalā silversword

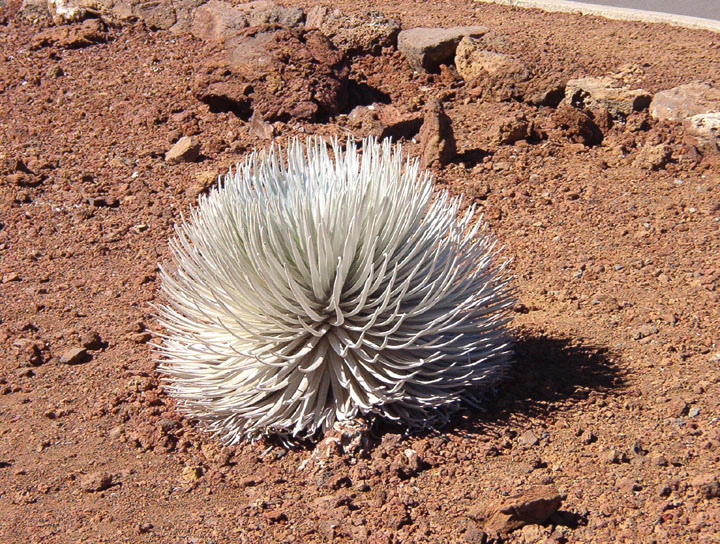
Silversword in Haleakalā Crater

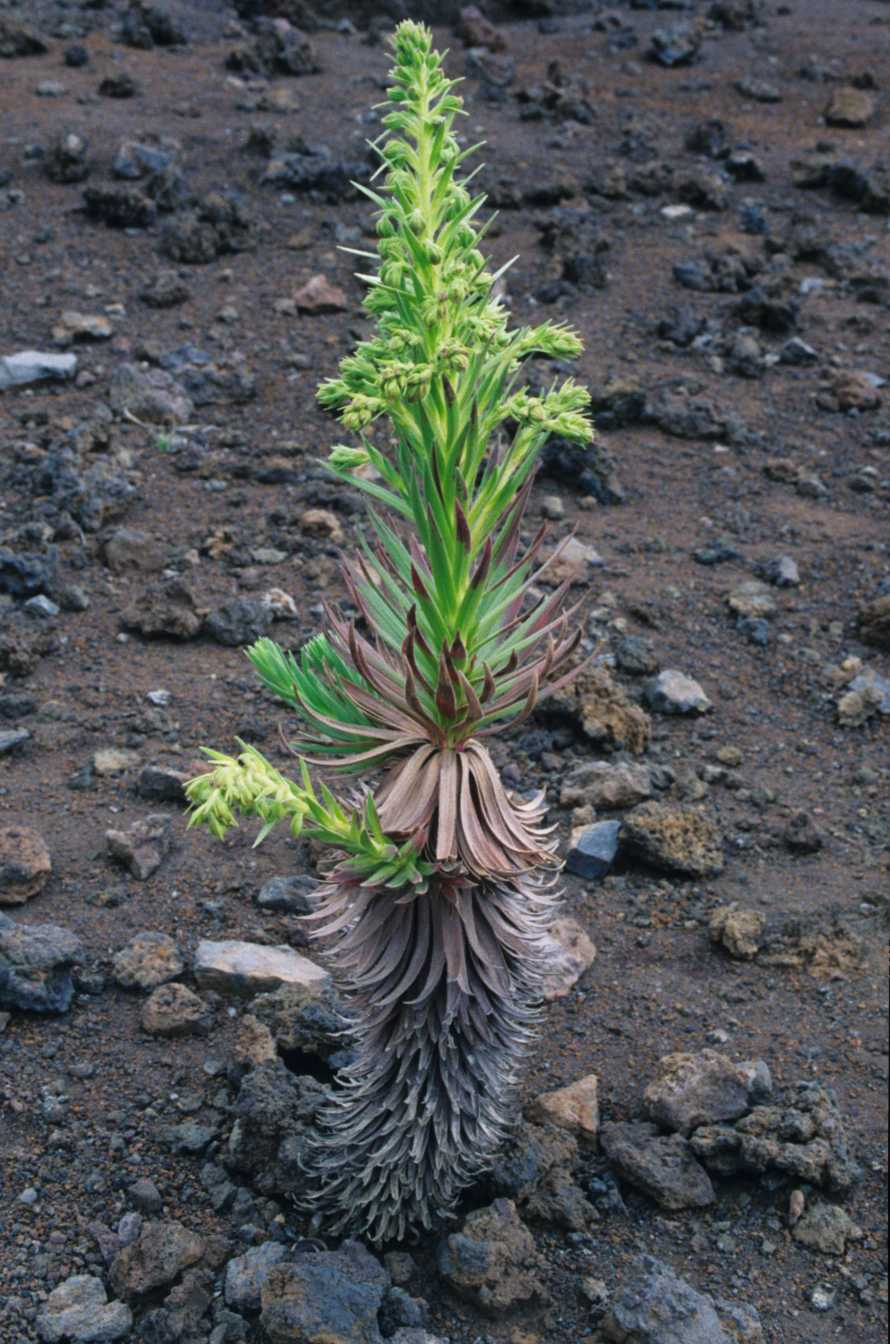
Dubautia-silversword hybrid in Haleakalā Crater

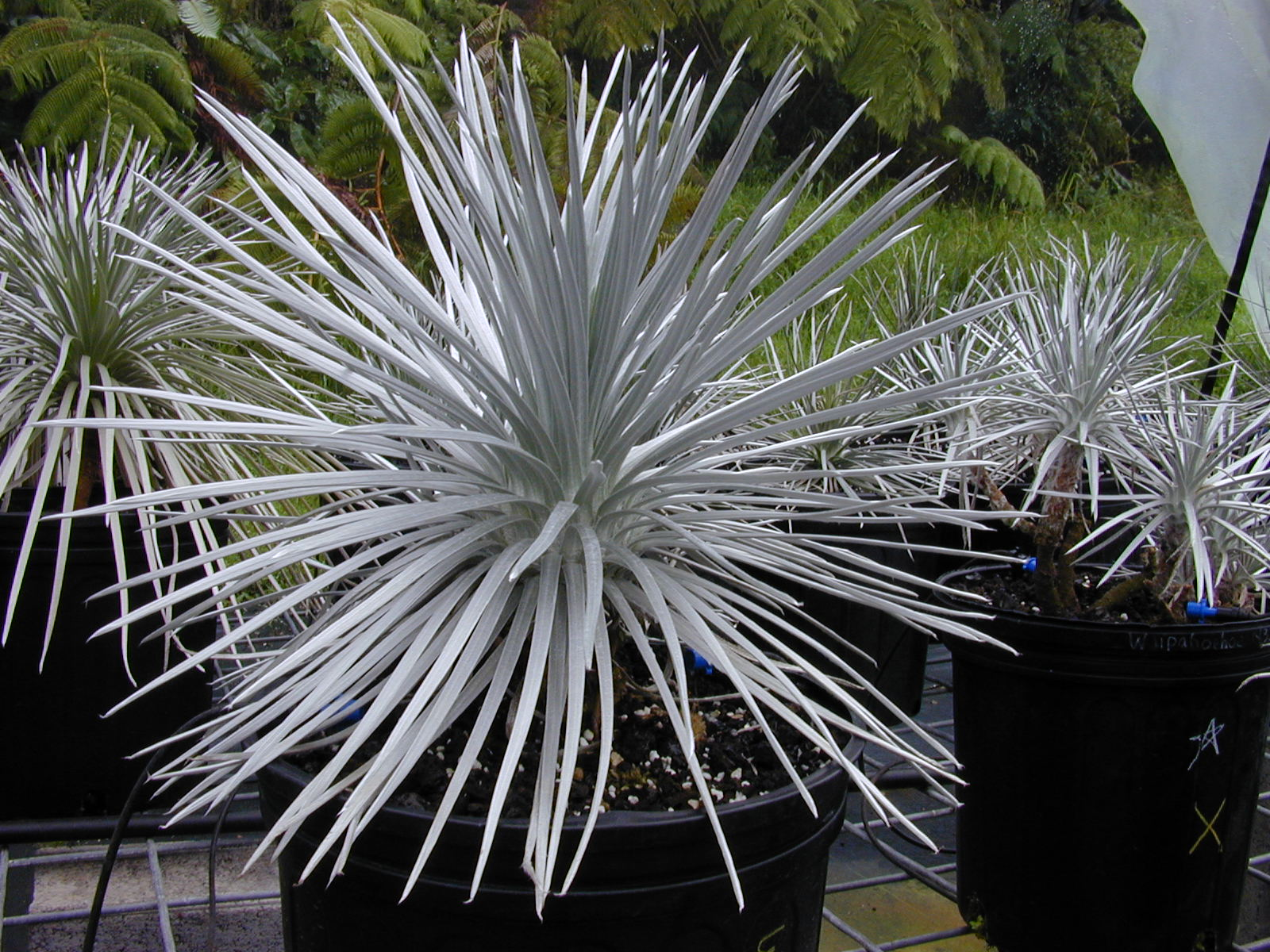
Mauna Kea silversword

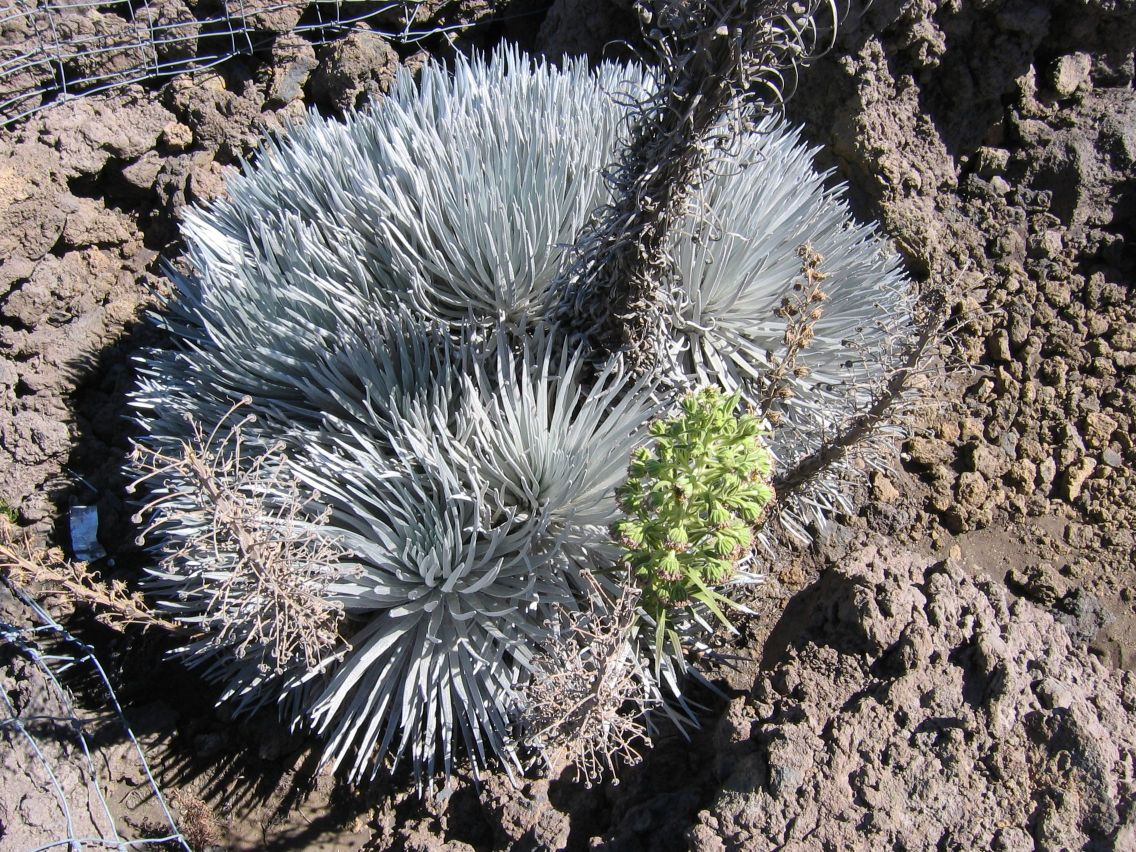
Mauna Kea silversword

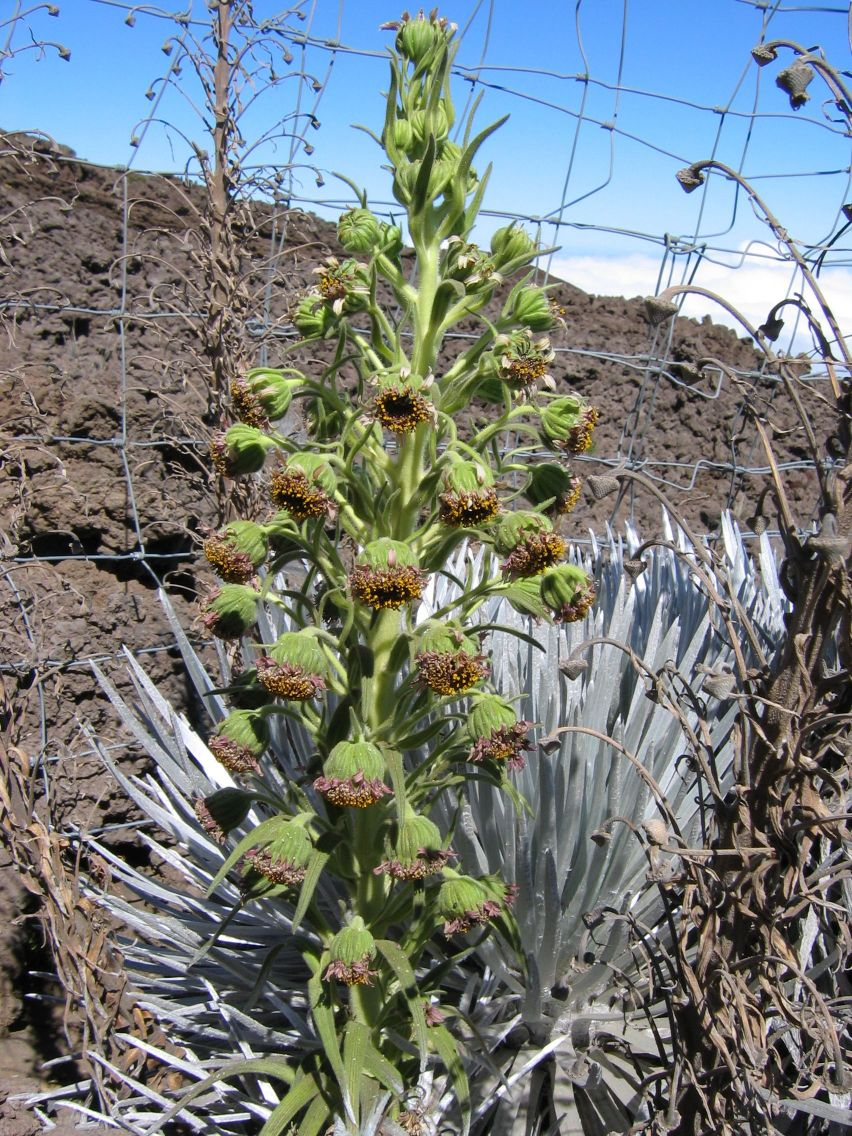
Mauna Kea silversword flowering

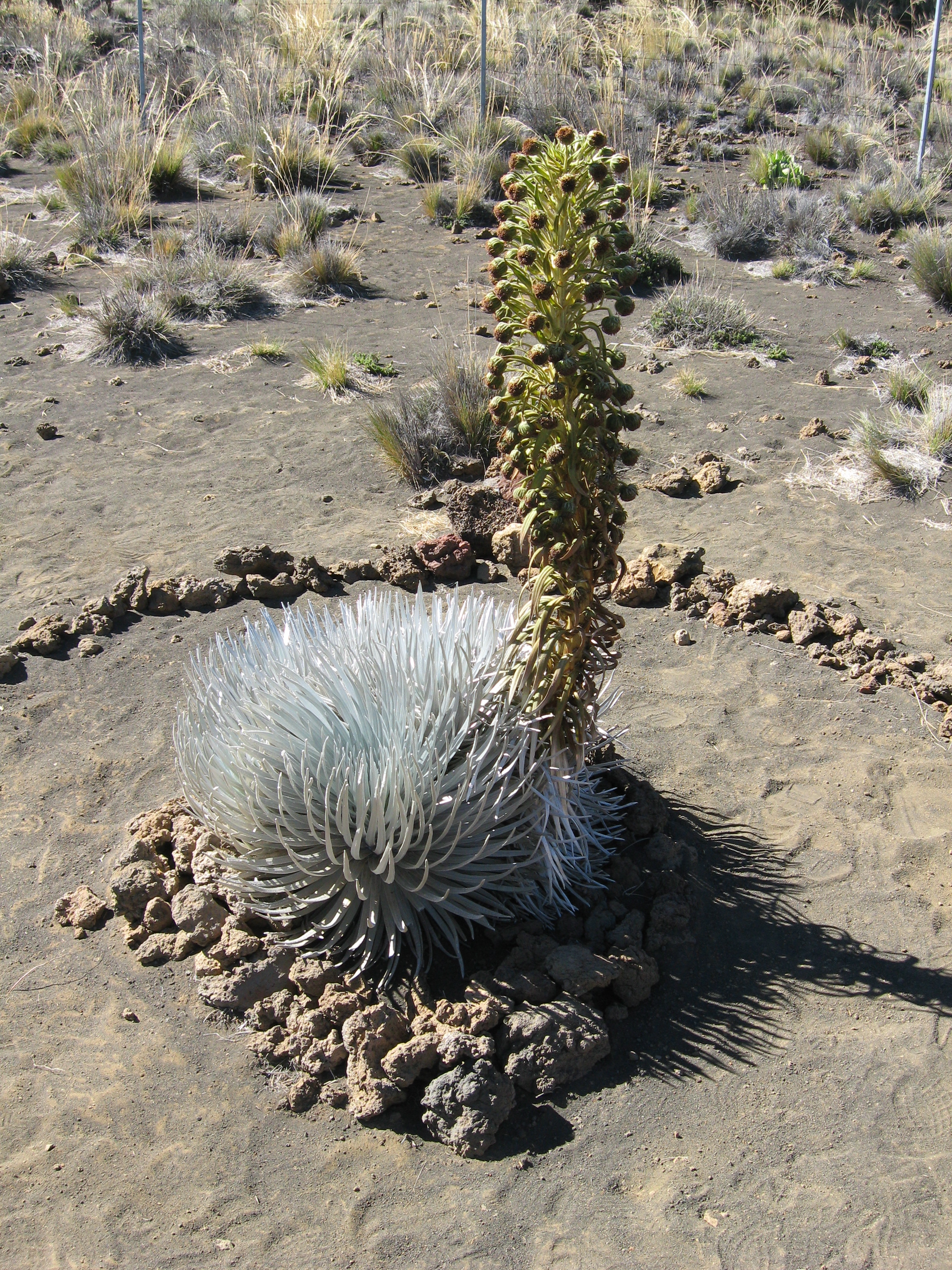
Mauna Kea silversword

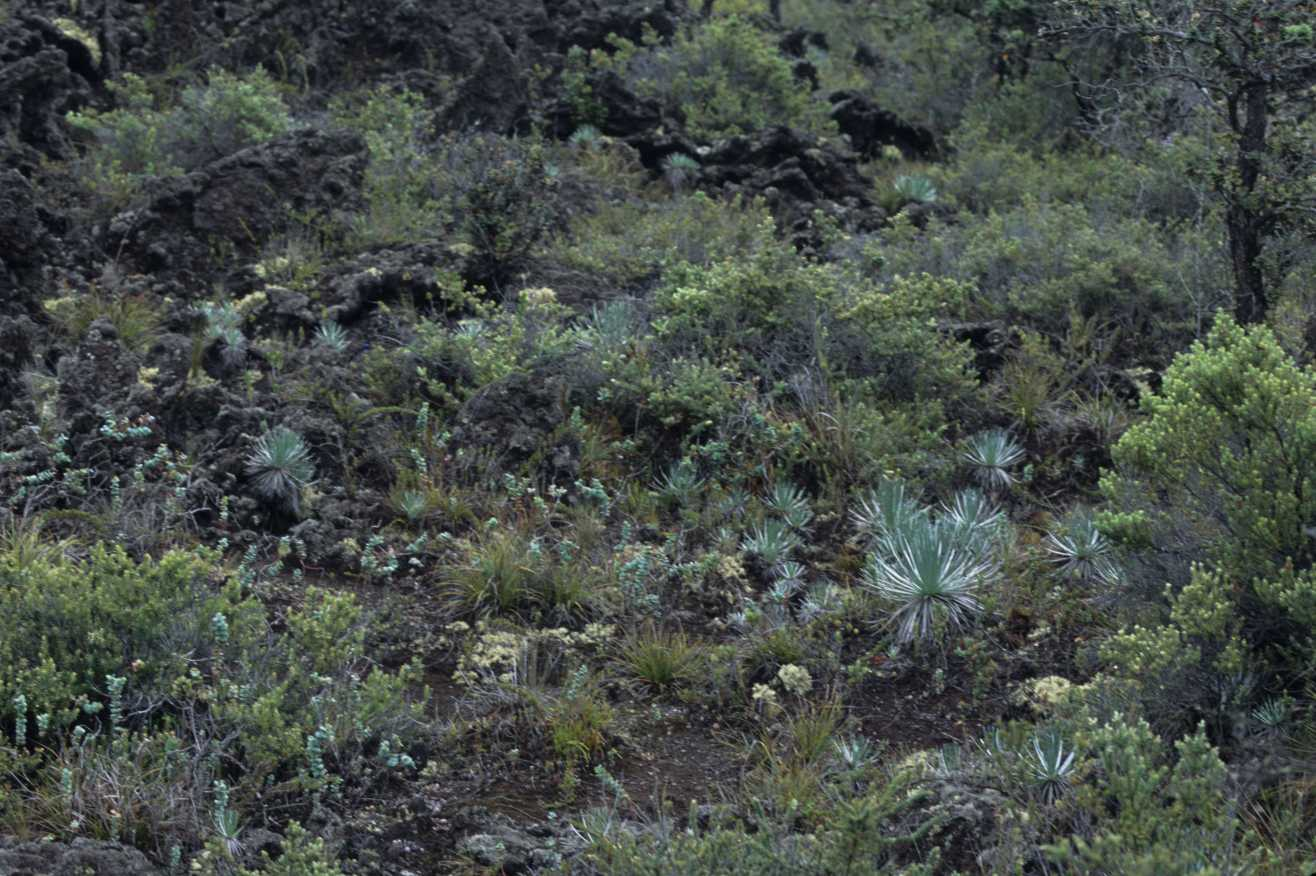
Mauna Loa silversword habitat, Kahuku

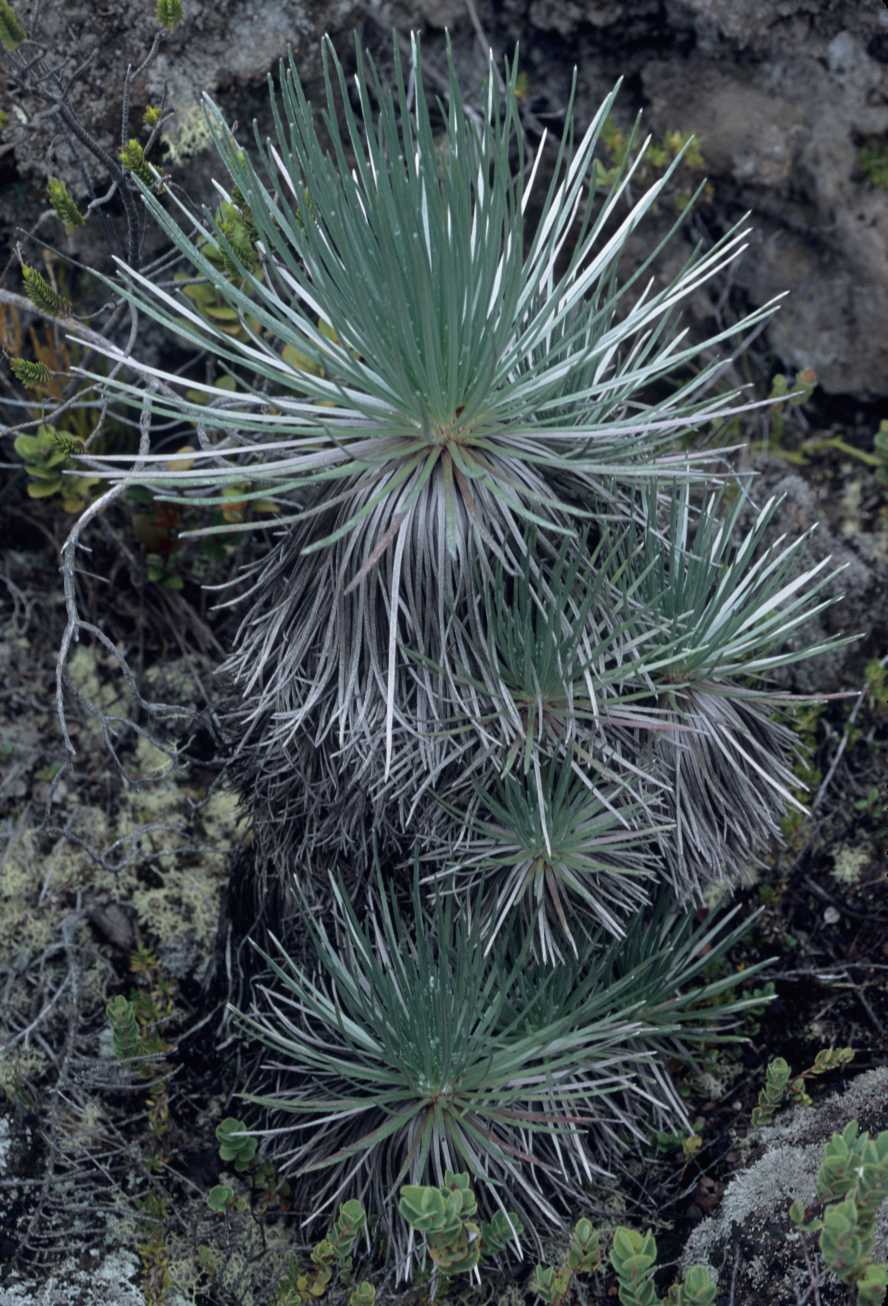
Mauna Loa silversword, multiple rosettes

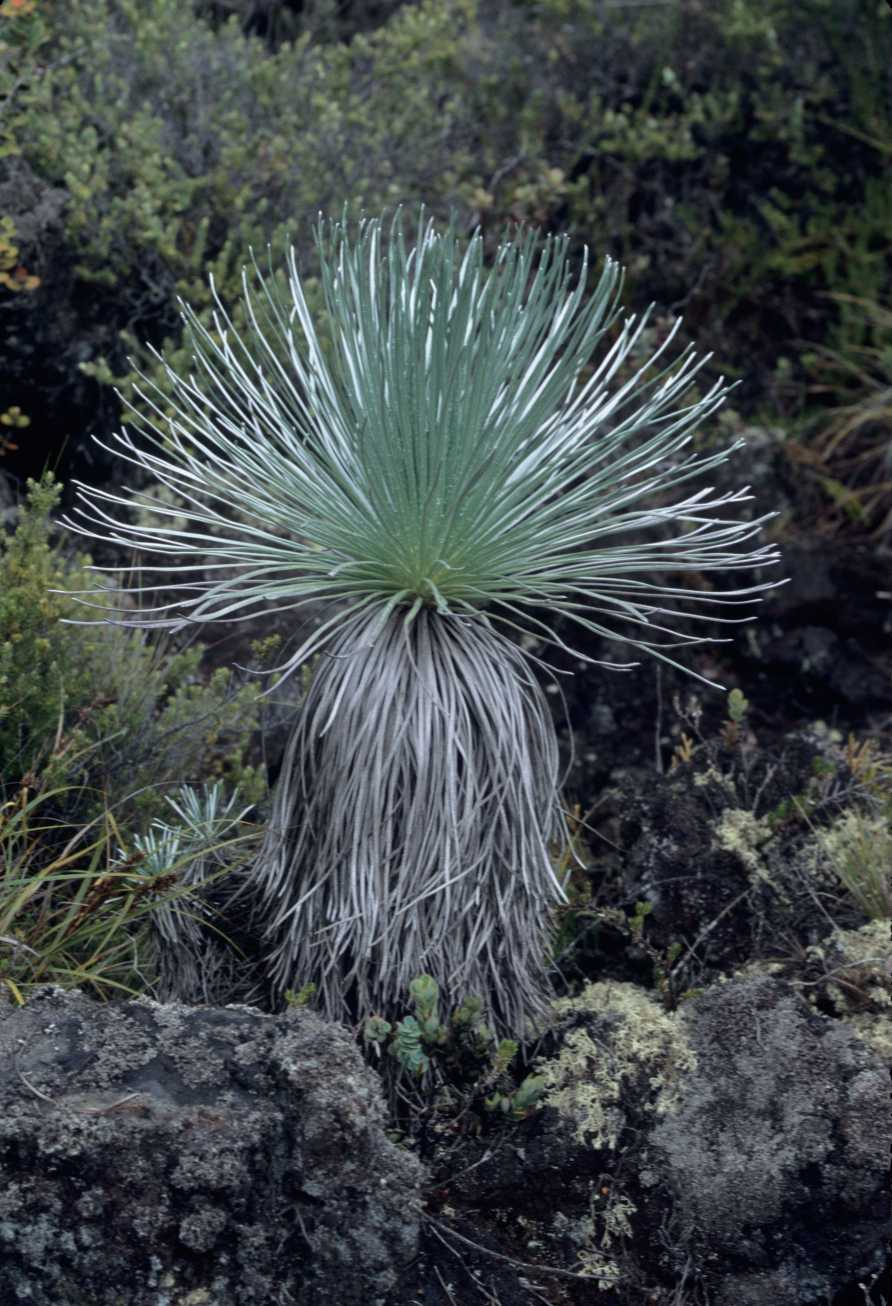
Mauna Loa silversword, single rosette

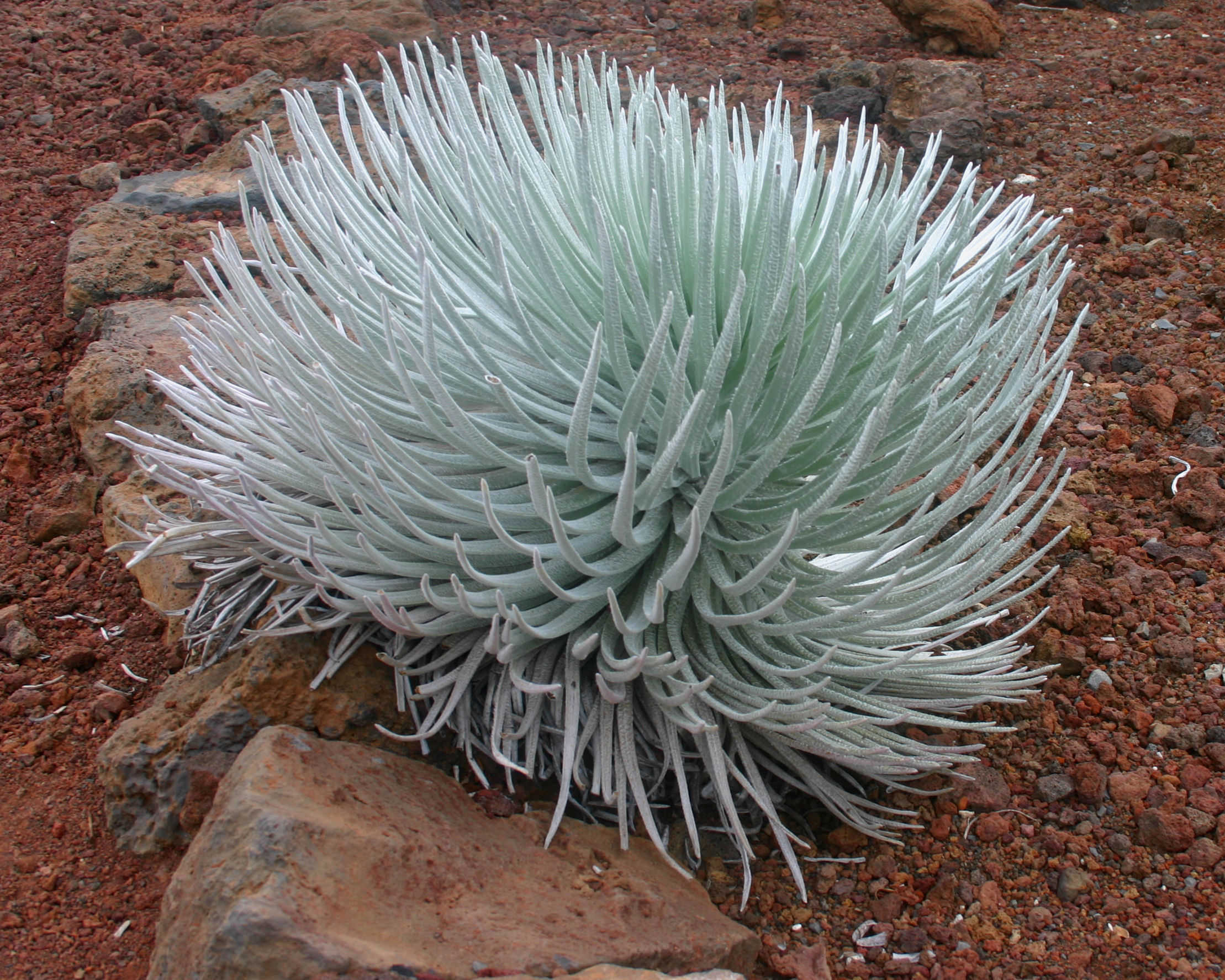
Haleakalā silversword (close-up)

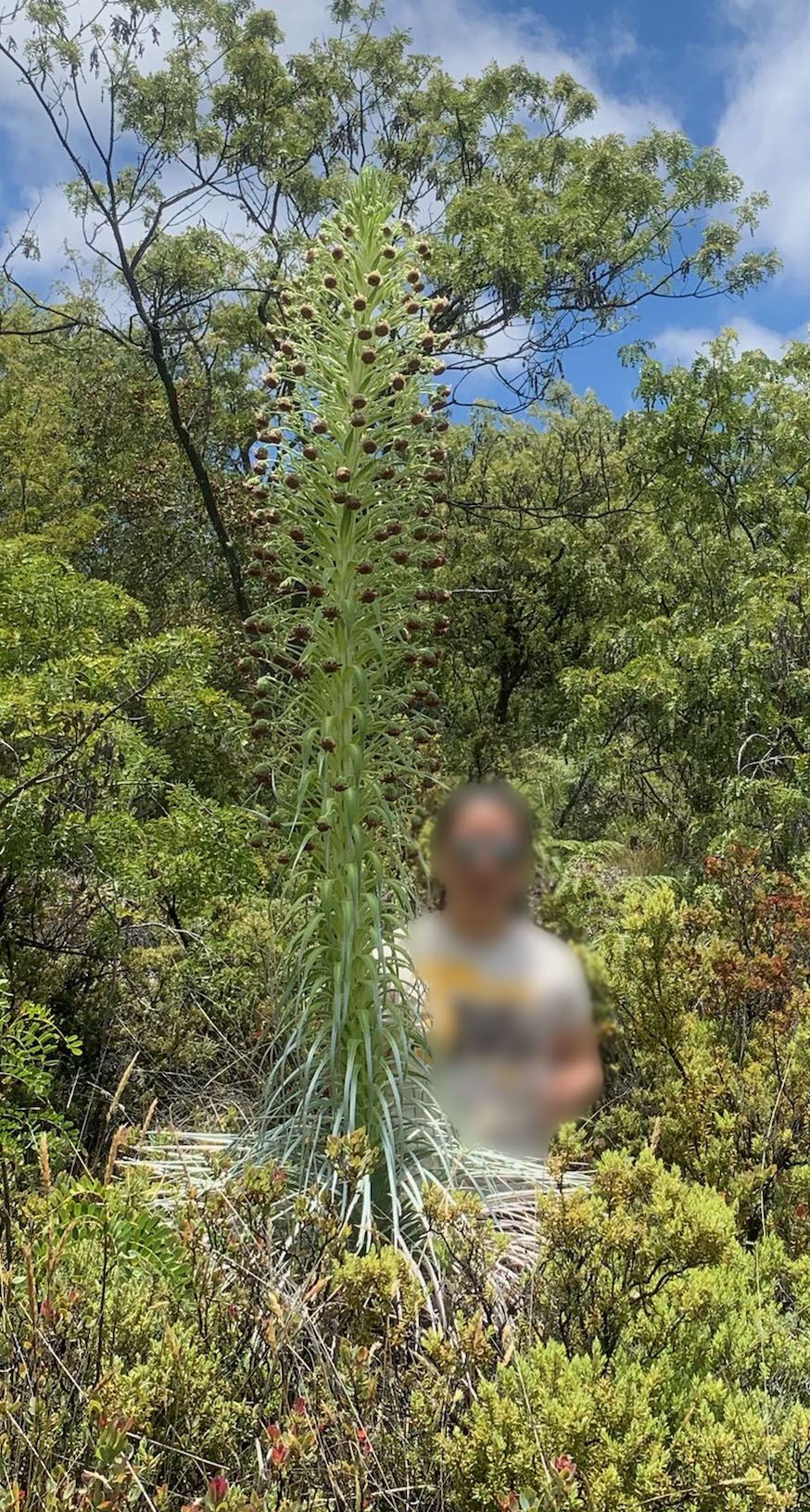
Mauna Loa silversword flowering
