= Puʻu Kukui =

Mountain Peak in Hawaii, United States

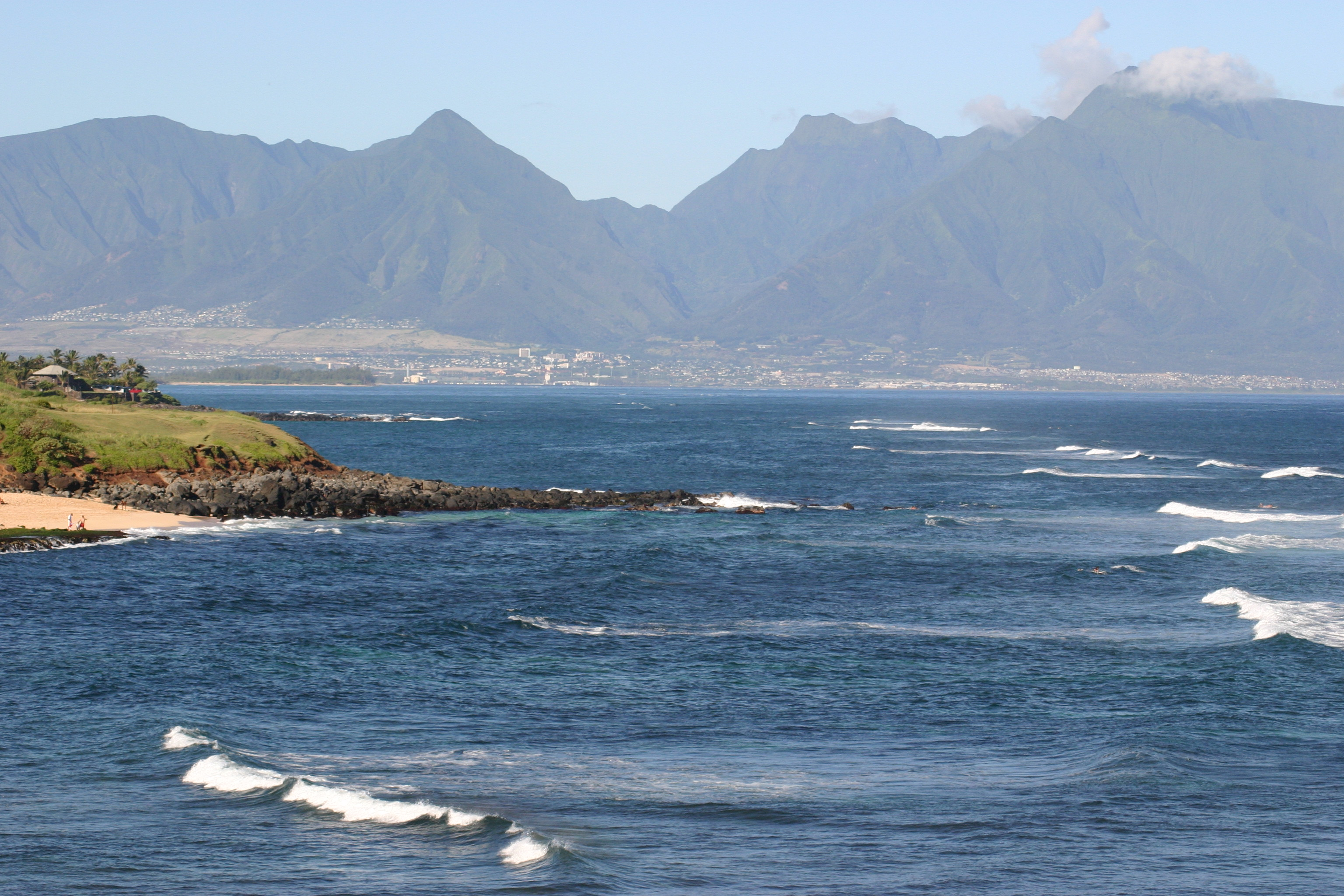
- Puʻu Kukui as seen from North Shore Maui

Highest point
- Elevation: 5,788 ft (1,764 m)
- Prominence: 5,668 ft (1,728 m)
- Listing: US most prominent peaks 81st Ribu
- Coordinates: 20°53′26″N 156°35′11″W

Geography
- Location within Hawaii
- Location: Maui, Hawaiʻi, U.S.
- Parent range: Hawaiian Islands
- Topo map: USGS Lahaina

Geology
- Rock age: <1.3 Mega-annum
- Mountain type: Eroded shield volcano
- Volcanic zone: Hawaiian–Emperor seamount chain

Climbing
- Easiest route: Hike

Puʻu Kukui is a mountain peak in Hawaiʻi, the highest of the West Maui Mountains (Mauna Kahalawai). The 5,788-foot (1,764 m) summit rises above the Puʻu Kukui Watershed Management Area, an 8,661-acre (35.05 km^{2}) private nature preserve maintained by the Maui Land & Pineapple Company. The peak was formed by a volcano whose caldera eroded into what is now the ʻĪao Valley.

Puʻu Kukui receives an average of 386.5 inches (9,820 mm) of rain a year, making it one of the wettest spots on Earth and third wettest in the state after Big Bog on Maui and Mount Waiʻaleʻale on Kauai, Rainwater unable to drain away flows into a bog. The soil is dense, deep, and acidic.

Puʻu Kukui is home to many endemic plants, insects, and birds, including the greensword (Argyroxiphium grayanum), a distinctive bog variety of ʻōhiʻa lehua (Metrosideros polymorpha var. pseudorugosa) and many lobelioid species. Due to the mountain peak's extreme climate and acidic peat soil, many species, such as the ʻōhiʻa, are represented as dwarfs. Access to the area is restricted to researchers and conservationists.

== See also ==
- List of mountain peaks of the United States
- Big Bog, Maui
- Mount Waialeale
  - List of volcanoes of the United States
    - List of mountain peaks of Hawaii
- List of Ultras of Oceania
- List of Ultras of the United States
- Hawaii hotspot
- Evolution of Hawaiian volcanoes
- Hawaiian–Emperor seamount chain
