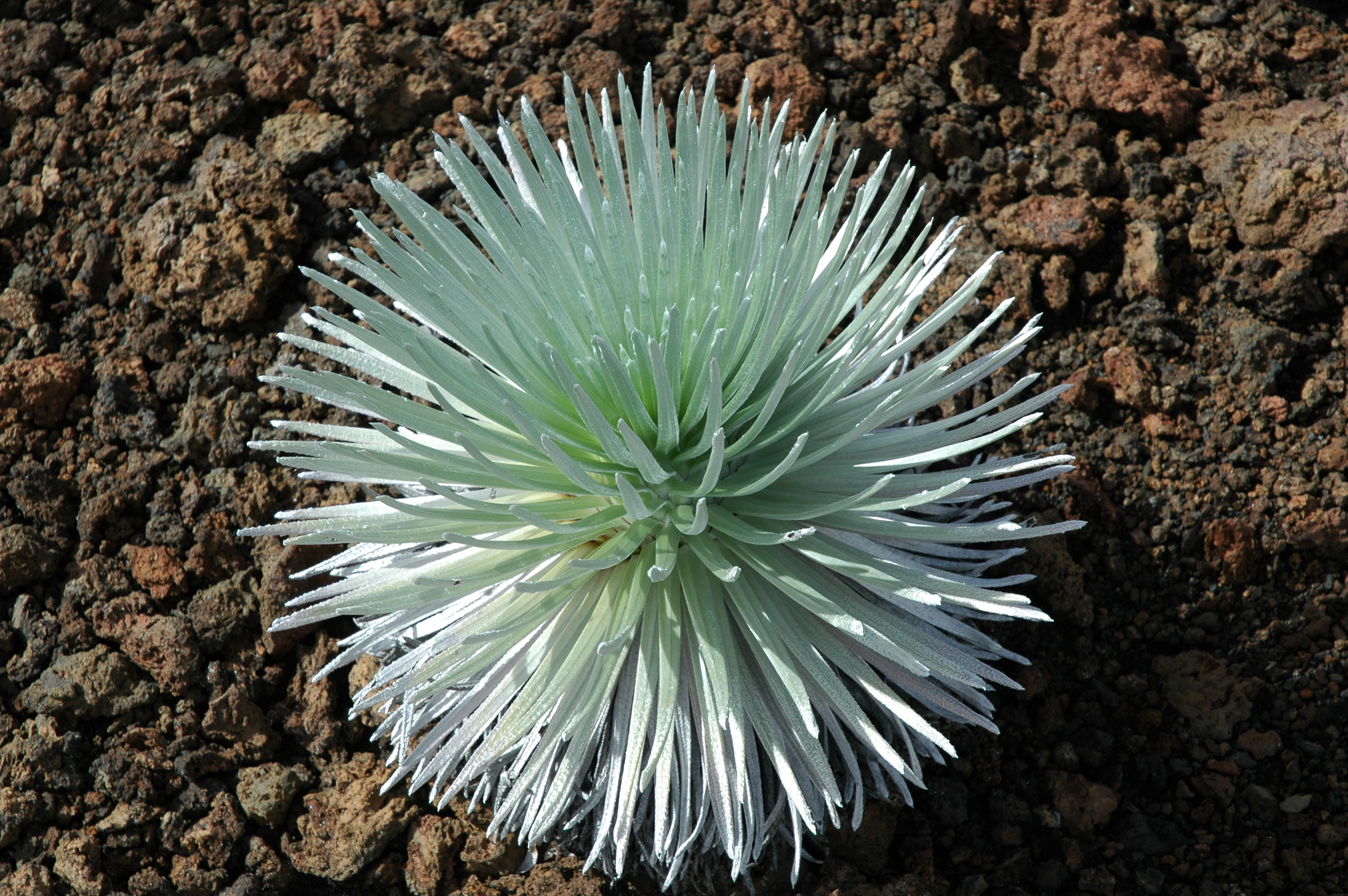
- Haleakala silversword (A. sandwicense subsp. macrocephalum)

Conservation status
- Endangered (IUCN 3.1)

Scientific classification
- Kingdom: Plantae
- Clade: Tracheophytes
- Clade: Angiosperms
- Clade: Eudicots
- Clade: Asterids
- Order: Asterales
- Family: Asteraceae
- Genus: Argyroxiphium
- Species: A. sandwicense

Binomial name
- Argyroxiphium sandwicense DC.

= Argyroxiphium sandwicense =

Species of plant

Argyroxiphium sandwicense, the Hawaiʻi silversword, or hinahina is a species of silversword. It is endemic to Hawaii. The two subspecies are separated by geography. Both subspecies are rare, threatened and federally protected.

- Haleakala silversword (A. sandwicense subsp. macrocephalum) is found on the mountain Haleakalā on the island of Maui at elevations above 2,100 m (6,900 ft). It is a federally listed threatened species.
- Mauna Kea silversword (A. sandwicense subsp. sandwicense) is found on the mountain Mauna Kea on the Hawaii Island at elevations above 2,600 m (8,500 ft). It is a federally listed endangered species. As few as 40 individuals are left.

== Reproduction ==
The silversword flowers only once in its lifespan of 20 to 90 years.

== Natural history ==
One of the reasons that the silversword is now an endangered species is the introduction of foreign hoofed mammals (ungulates) by European colonizers. As the population of ungulates (most notably sheep) grew, the population of silversword decreased (Robichaux, 1997).

== Threats ==
One study found that it may not survive climate change.
