= Hawaiian tropical high shrublands =

Tropical savanna ecoregion of the Hawaiian Islands in the United States

Coordinates: 20°N 156°W

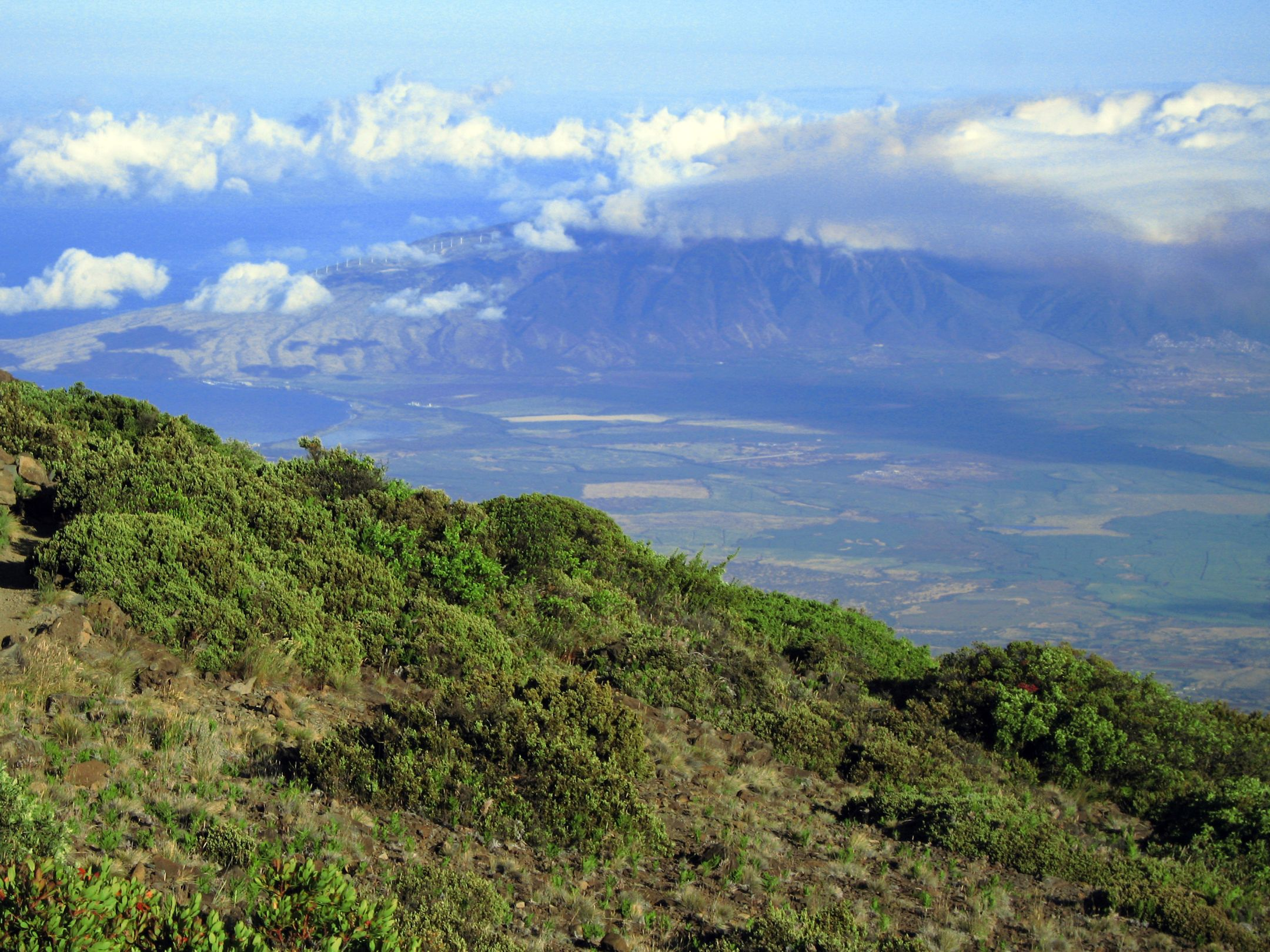
- Slopes of Haleakalā, Maui

Ecology
- Realm: Oceanian
- Biome: Tropical and subtropical grasslands, savannas, and shrublands
- Borders: Hawaiian tropical rainforests; Hawaiian tropical dry forests

Geography
- Area: 1,900 km^{2} (730 mi^{2})
- Country: United States
- State: Hawaii
- Climate type: Subtropical highland (Cfb and Cwb)

Conservation
- Conservation status: Vulnerable
- Global 200: No

The Hawaiian tropical high shrublands are a tropical savanna ecoregion in the Hawaiian Islands.

== Geography ==
The high shrublands ecoregion covers an area of 1,900 km^{2} (730 sq mi) on the upper slopes of the volcanoes Mauna Kea, Mauna Loa, Hualālai, and Haleakalā.

== Flora ==
The plant communities include open shrublands, grasslands, and deserts. Shrubland species include ʻāheahea (Chenopodium oahuense), ʻōhelo ʻai (Vaccinium reticulatum), naʻenaʻe (Dubautia menziesii), and ʻiliahi (Santalum haleakalae). Alpine grasslands are dominated by tussock grasses, such as Deschampsia nubigena, Eragrostis atropioides, Panicum tenuifolium, and pili uka (Trisetum glomeratum). Deserts occur on the coldest and driest peaks, where only extremely hardy plants such as ʻāhinahina (Argyroxiphium sandwicense) and Dubautia species are able to grow.

== Fauna ==
The nēnē (Branta sandvicensis) is one of the few birds found in alpine shrublands, while ʻuaʻu (Pterodroma sandwichensis) nest in this ecoregion.

== See also ==
- List of ecoregions in the United States (WWF)
