= Argyroxiphium virescens =

Conservation status
- Extinct (IUCN 3.1)

Scientific classification
- Kingdom: Plantae
- Clade: Tracheophytes
- Clade: Angiosperms
- Clade: Eudicots
- Clade: Asterids
- Order: Asterales
- Family: Asteraceae
- Genus: Argyroxiphium
- Species: †A. virescens

Binomial name
- †Argyroxiphium virescens Hillebr.

Species of flowering plant

Argyroxiphium virescens was a species of flowering plant in the family Asteraceae that was last seen in 1945. It was found only in the Hawaiian Islands where it was endemic to the eastern part of Maui. Its natural habitats were subtropical or tropical moist montane forests and subtropical or tropical high-altitude shrubland. It is officially declared extinct, but in 1989 plants were discovered that appear to be hybrids between it and the Haleakalā silversword. This hybrid is known as the Pu'u 'Alaea greensword.
