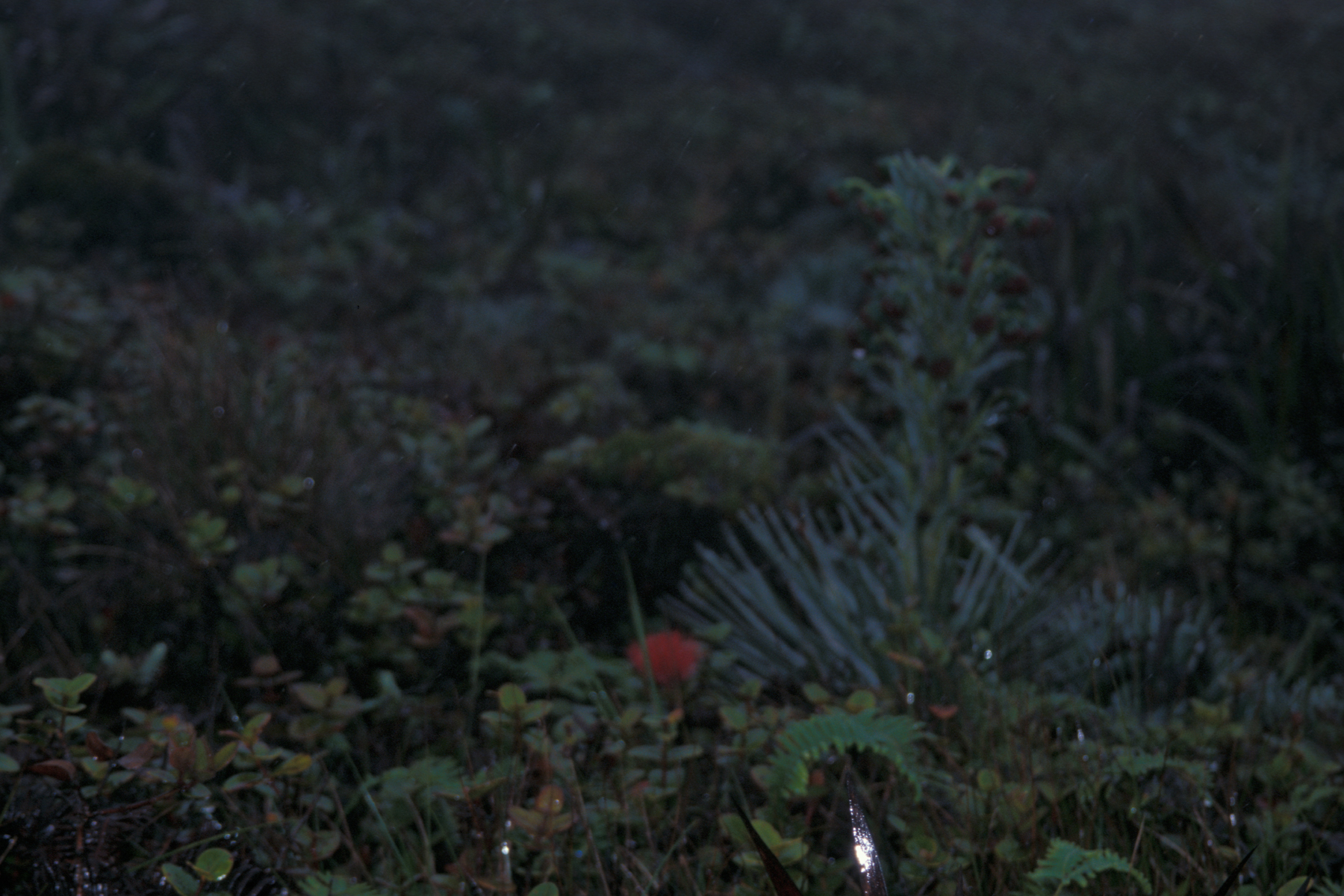

Conservation status
- Vulnerable (IUCN 3.1)

Scientific classification
- Kingdom: Plantae
- Clade: Tracheophytes
- Clade: Angiosperms
- Clade: Eudicots
- Clade: Asterids
- Order: Asterales
- Family: Asteraceae
- Genus: Argyroxiphium
- Species: A. caliginis

Binomial name
- Argyroxiphium caliginis C.N.Forbes

= Argyroxiphium caliginis =

Species of plant

Argyroxiphium caliginis, the ʻEke silversword, is a species of flowering plant in the family Asteraceae.

It is found only in two Hawaiian tropical rainforest bogs in West Maui, Hawaiʻi.

The species is threatened by damage to the bogs by rooting feral pigs, but the main population at ʻEke Crater is now protected by fencing.

== See also ==
- Silversword alliance
