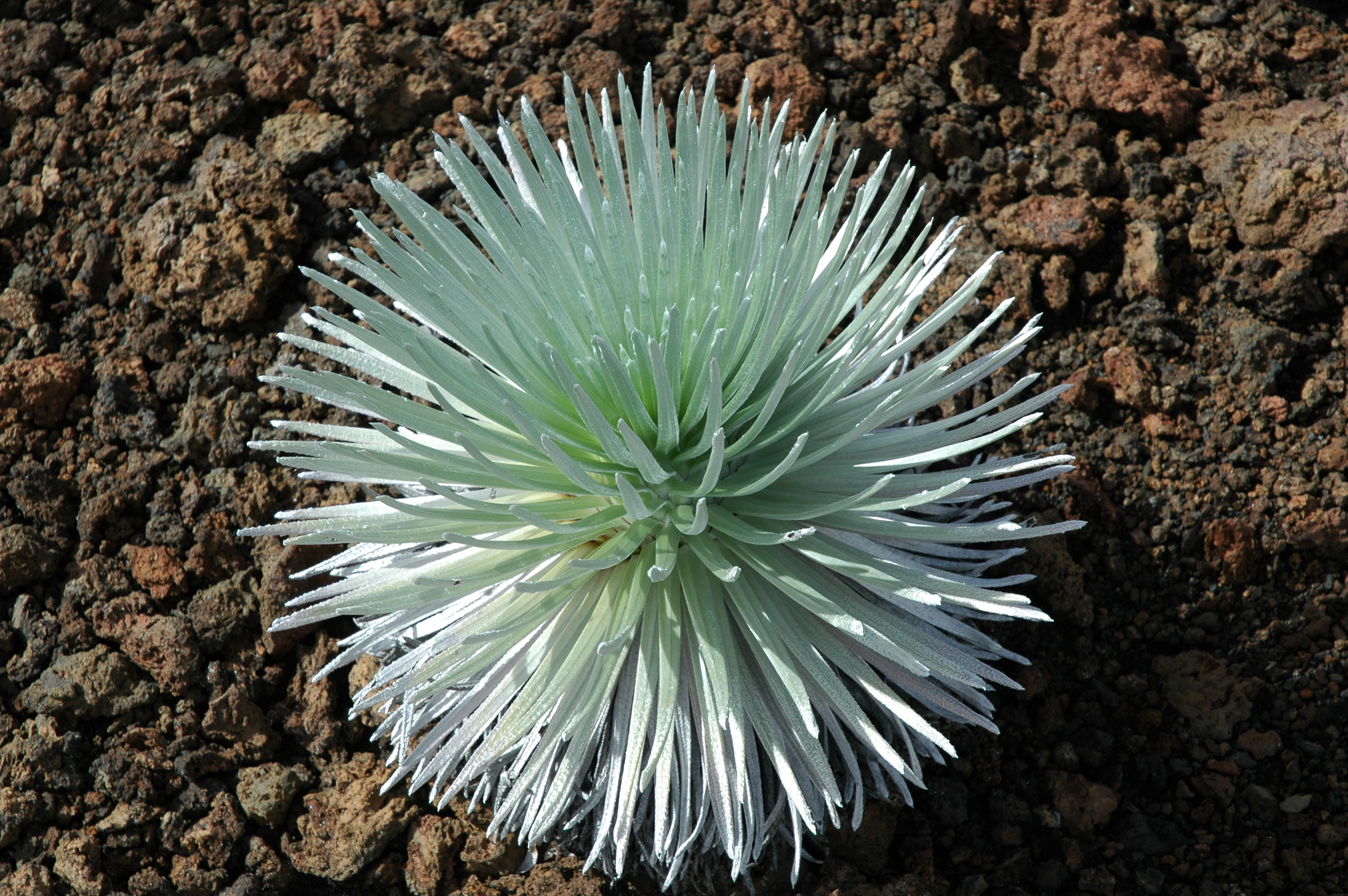

Conservation status
- Critically Endangered (IUCN 3.1)

Scientific classification
- Kingdom: Plantae
- Clade: Tracheophytes
- Clade: Angiosperms
- Clade: Eudicots
- Clade: Asterids
- Order: Asterales
- Family: Asteraceae
- Genus: Argyroxiphium
- Species: A. sandwicense
- Subspecies: A. s. subsp. macrocephalum

Trinomial name
- Argyroxiphium sandwicense subsp. macrocephalum (A. Gray) Mérat

Synonyms
- Argyroxiphium macrocephalum A.Gray

= Argyroxiphium sandwicense subsp. macrocephalum =

Haleakalā silversword

Subspecies of flowering plant

Argyroxiphium sandwicense subsp. macrocephalum, the east Maui silversword or Haleakalā silversword, is a rare plant, part of the family Asteraceae. The silversword in general is referred to as ʻāhinahina in Hawaiian (literally, "very gray").

== Distribution ==
The Haleakalā silversword is found on the island of Maui at elevations above 2,100 metres (6,900 ft) on the dormant Haleakalā volcano—on the summit depression, the rim summits, and surrounding slopes—in Haleakalā National Park. The Haleakalā silversword has been a threatened species as defined by the U.S. Fish and Wildlife Service, since May 15, 1992. Prior to that time, excessive grazing by cattle and goats, and vandalism inflicted by people in the 1920s, had caused its near extinction. Since strict monitoring and governmental protection took effect, the species' recovery is considered a successful conservation story, although threats remain.

== Description ==
The Haleakalā silversword, Argyroxiphium sandwicense subsp. macrocephalum, has numerous sword-like succulent leaves covered with silver hairs. Silversword plants in general grow on volcanic cinder, a dry, rocky substrate that is subject to freezing temperatures and high winds. The skin and hairs are strong enough to resist the wind and freezing temperature of this altitude and protect the plant from dehydration and the sun.

The plant's base of leaves, arranged in a spherical formation at ground level of the plant, dominates for the majority of the plant's life—which may be greater than 50 years. The leaves are arranged so that they and the hairs of the leaves can raise the temperature of the shoot-tip leaves up to 20 °C (68 °F), having adapted to the extreme high-altitude temperatures by focusing the sunlight to converge at this point and warm the plant.

The other subspecies, Argyroxiphium sandwicense subsp. sandwicense (Mauna Kea silversword), is found on Mauna Kea. They differ primarily in the inflorescence shape—broader in the Haleakalā plants (less than 4 times as long as wide) and narrower on Mauna Kea (4.3–8.6 times as long as wide). The Haleakalā subspecies also generally has more ray florets, 11–42 versus 5–20 for Mauna Kea.

=== Lifecycle ===
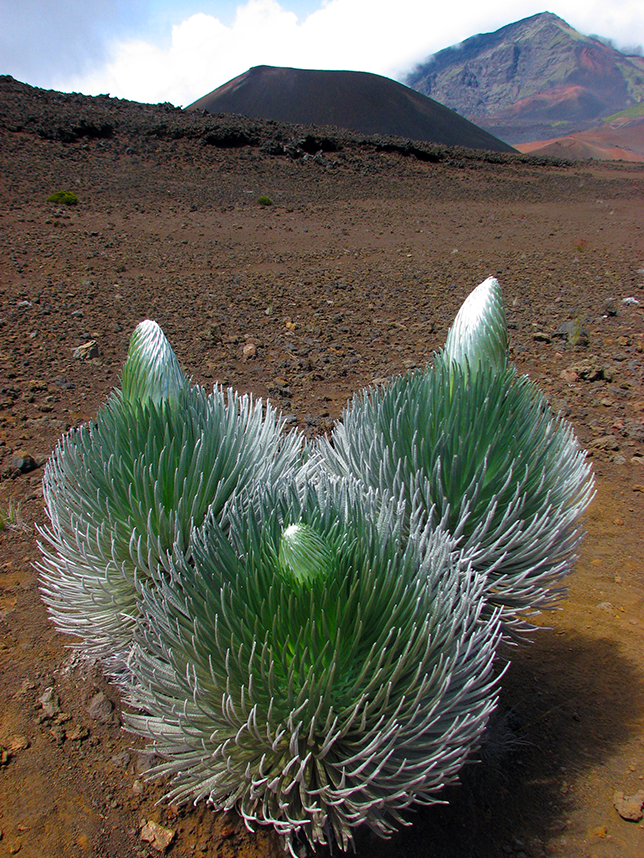

At senescence, which often occurs when the plant reaches a diameter of approximately 0.5 metres (1.6 ft), the plant produces a tall stalk in just a few weeks of maroon ray flowers which resemble the sunflower. Flowering usually occurs from July through October. The leaves become limp and dry as the monocarpic plant then goes to seed and dies.

The flowering stalk may have up to 600 heads of up to 40 outlying ray flowers and 600 disk flowers and is pollinated by flying insects like Hylaeus (Nesoprosopis) volcanicus. The flower stalk can reach up to 2 metres (6.6 ft) in height and has numerous tiny sticky hairs to prevent crawling insects from damaging the plant. Seeding is a critical time because damage to the flowers or stalk by insects before the seeds can mature can jeopardize the plant's entire reproductive output.

== History and conservation ==
Before the National Park Service was granted control of Haleakalā volcano, visitors to the volcano's summit often participated in the common practice of uprooting a silversword plant and then rolling it on the jagged lava rock terrain, drying the flowers for arrangements, or using the plant as kindling. Because the delicate, shallow root structure can be crushed by walking in the rocks around the plant, they are very sensitive to foreign elements. Feeding by goats also severely damaged many plants and prevented reproduction. Ungulates are now fenced out of the crater area and the species is legally protected from damage by humans.

== Gallery ==
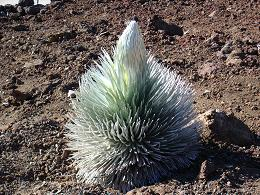
Flower head bud, Haleakalā National Park

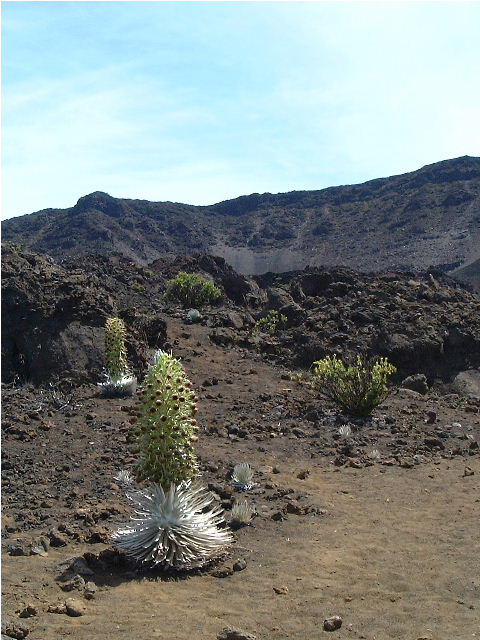
Silverswords in bloom in Haleakalā crater

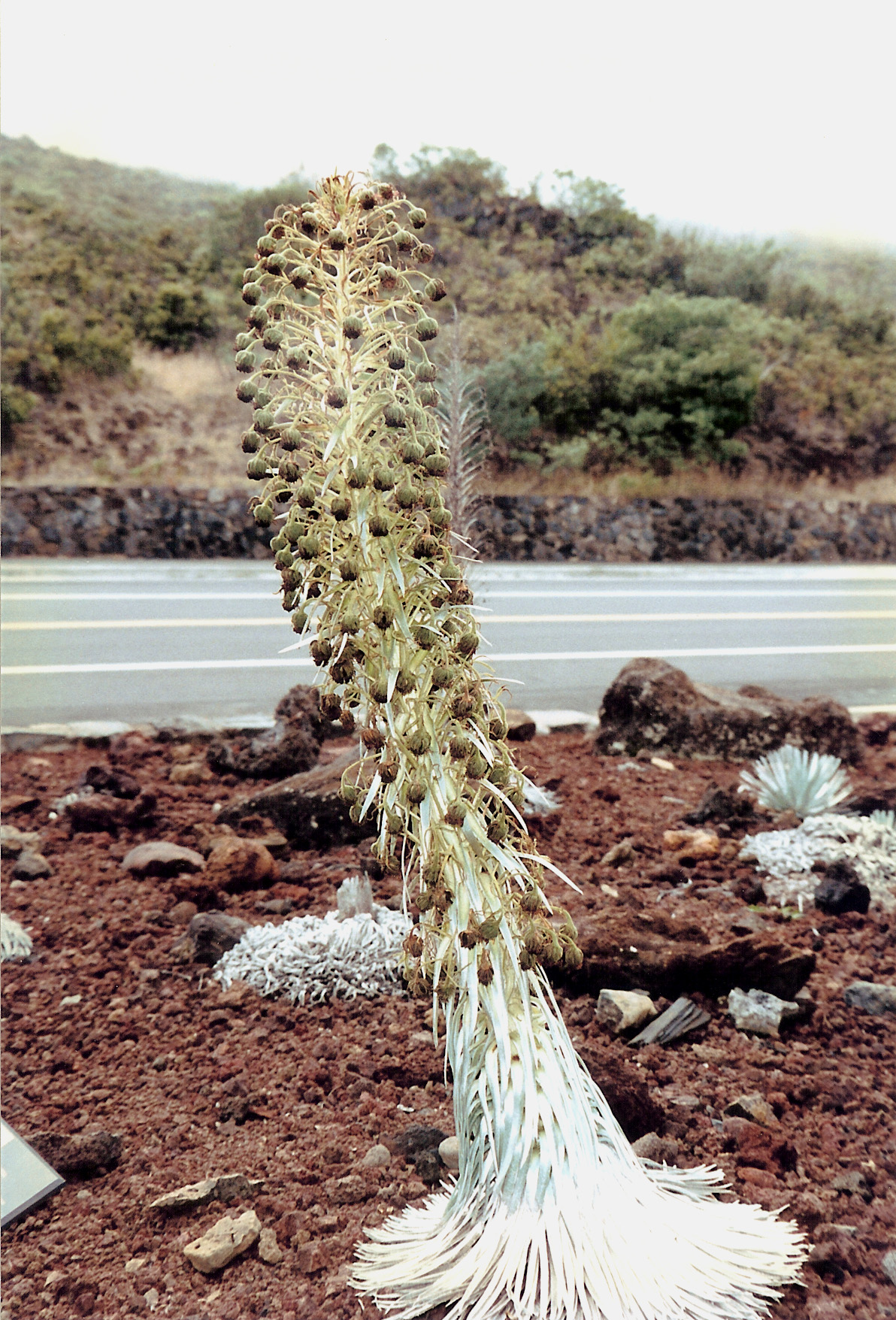
Haleakalā silversword at summit of Haleakalā National Park, Maui

Dying Haleakalā silversword after blooming at Haleakalā National Park, Maui

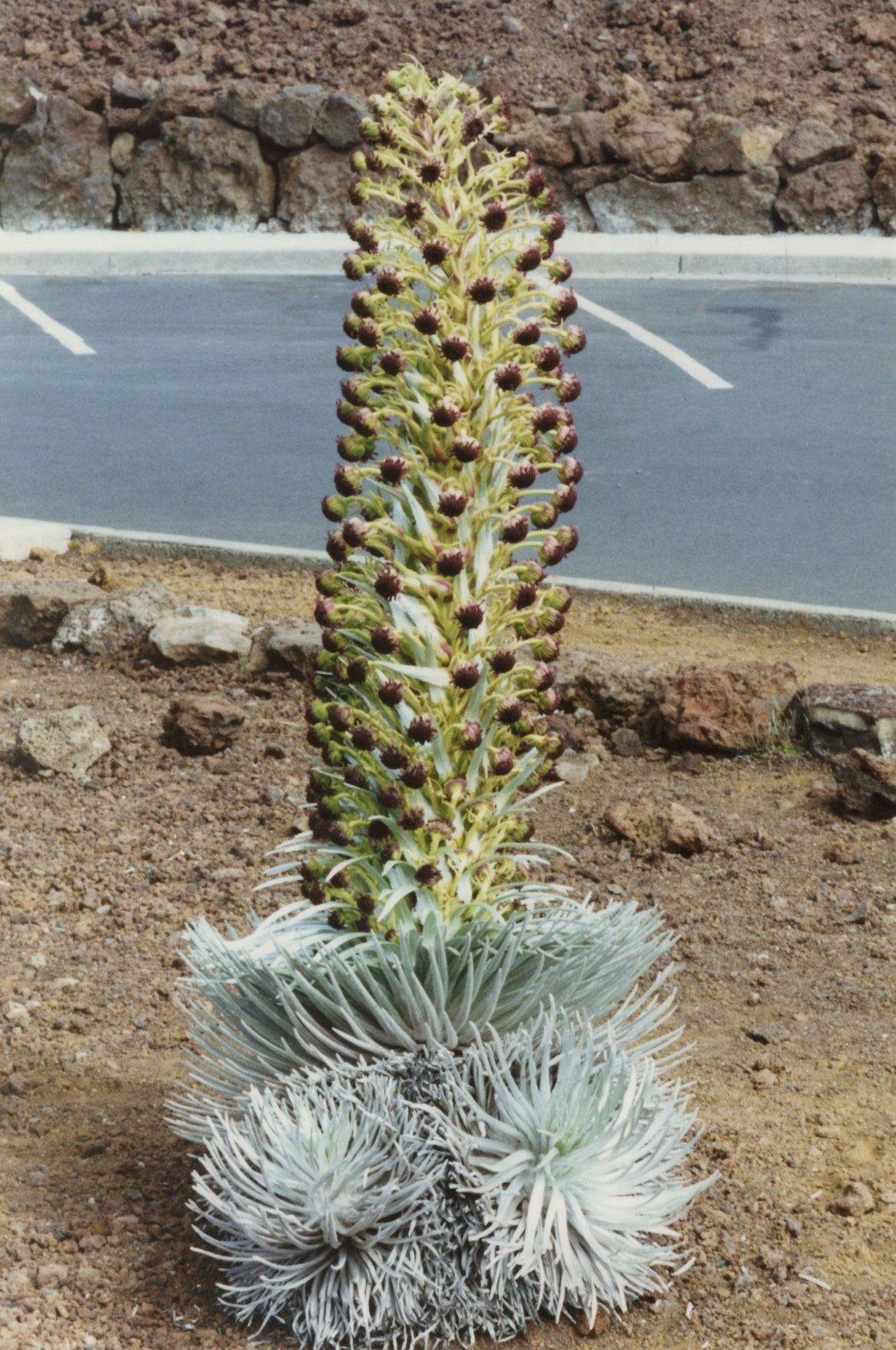
Multiple rosettes indicate this individual may have Dubautia genes, although it does not have the yellow flowers of most hybrids.

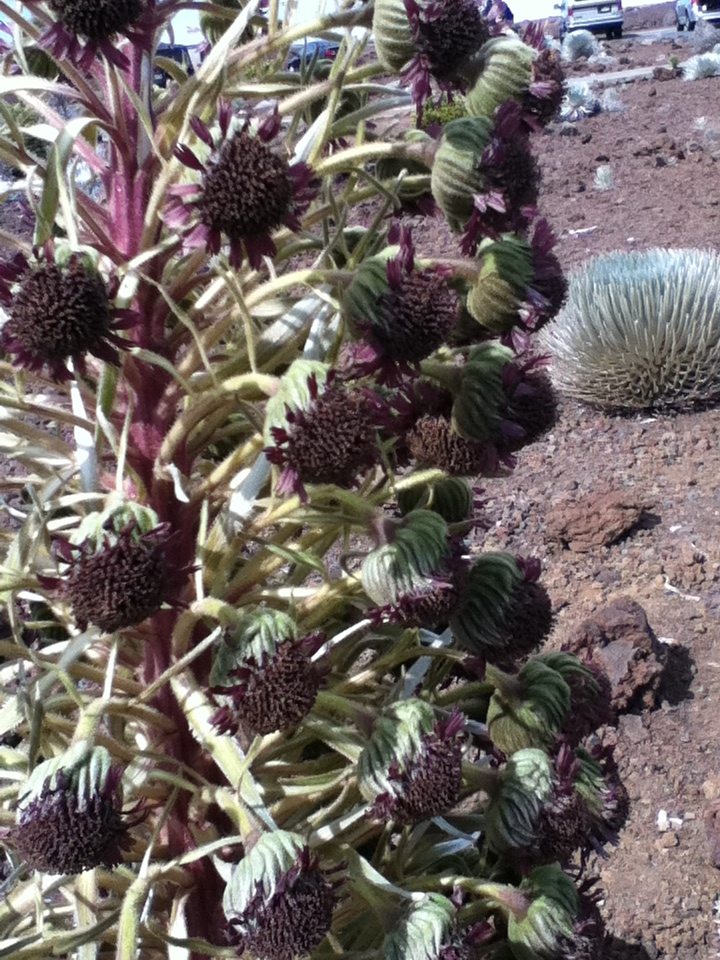
Close-up of flowers

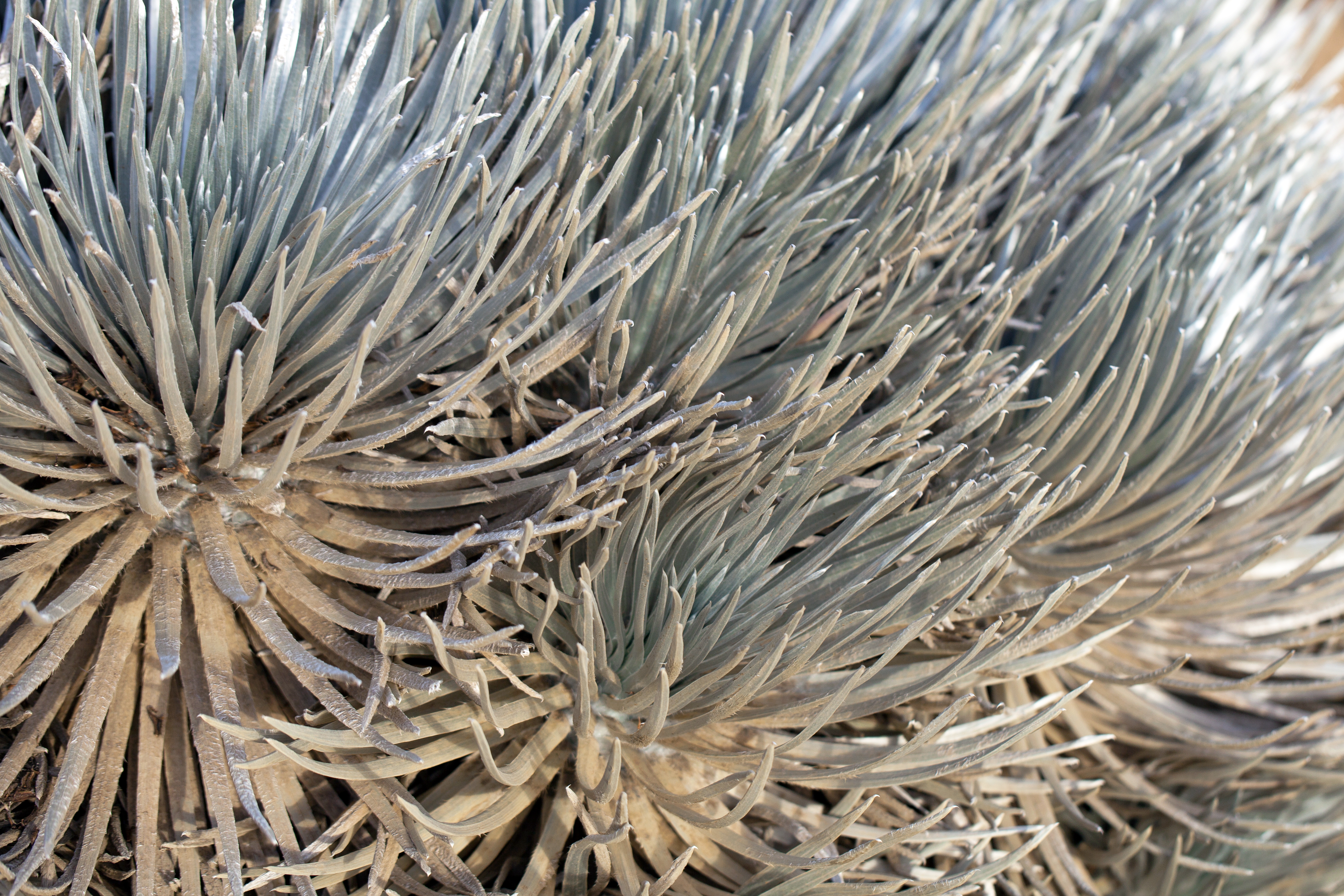
Strong silver hairs cover the sword-like leaves.

== See also ==
- Silversword alliance
