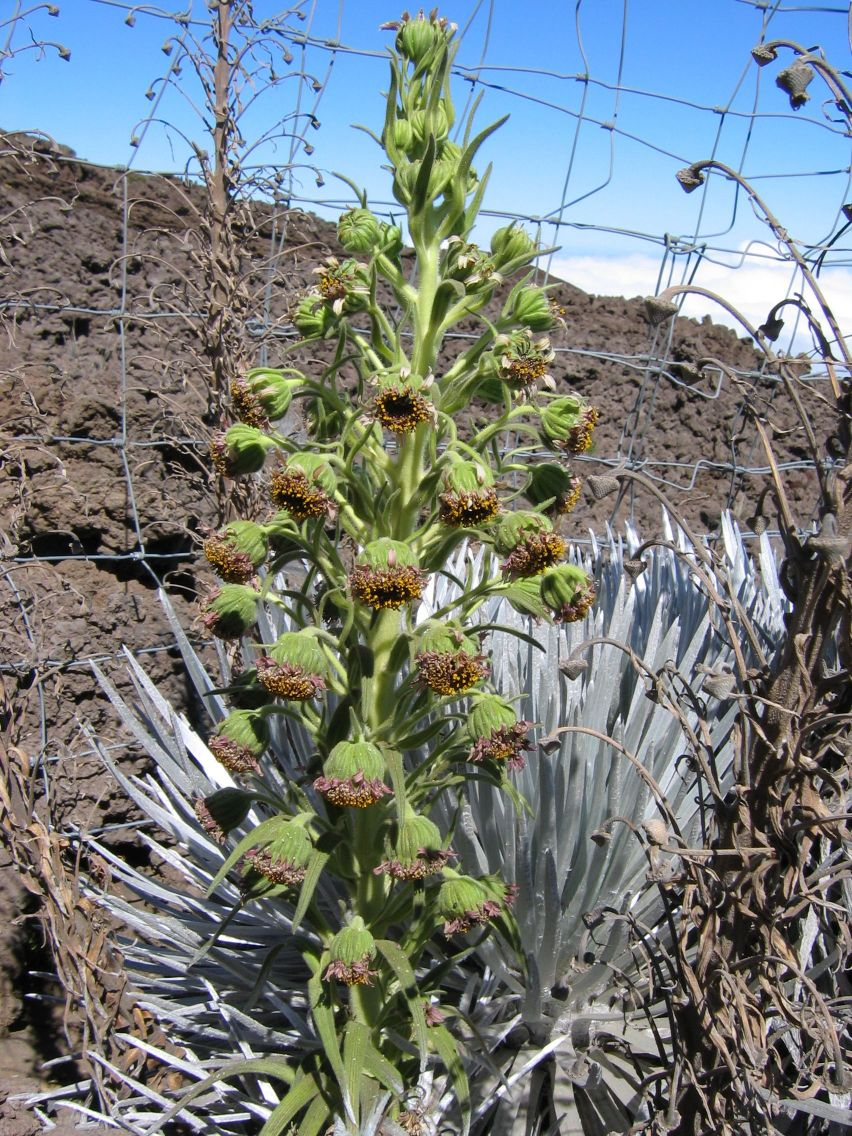
- Mauna Kea silversword on Mauna Kea (note protective fence)

Conservation status
- Critically Endangered (IUCN 3.1)

Scientific classification
- Kingdom: Plantae
- Clade: Embryophytes
- Clade: Tracheophytes
- Clade: Angiosperms
- Clade: Eudicots
- Clade: Asterids
- Order: Asterales
- Family: Asteraceae
- Genus: Argyroxiphium
- Species: A. sandwicense DC.
- Subspecies: A. s. subsp. sandwicense

Trinomial name
- Argyroxiphium sandwicense subsp. sandwicense

= Mauna Kea silversword =

Subspecies of flowering plant

Argyroxiphium sandwicense subsp. sandwicense, the Mauna Kea silversword, is a highly endangered flowering plant endemic to the island of Hawaiʻi (Big Island) of Hawaii. It is the "crown jewel" of the volcanic mountain Mauna Kea, from which it derives its English name. The Hawaiian name is ʻahinahina; it applies to silverswords more broadly. The Mauna Kea silversword was once common on the volcano, and extraordinary conservation efforts are being made to preserve the species.

== Silverswords – Argyroxiphium ==
Closely related to the Haleakala silversword (Argyroxiphium sandwicense subsp. macrocephalum) and in the family Asteraceae, the Mauna Kea silversword is a member of the silversword alliance, a group of approximately 50 species in three genera, all endemic to the Hawaiian islands. Their diverse morphologies belie extremely close genetic kinship and suggest extremely rapid evolution from a single precursor species. The silversword alliance is considered the most dramatic example of adaptive radiation among plants in Hawaii, illustrating the role of isolation and distinctive ecological conditions in promoting evolution.

== Description ==
The Mauna Kea silversword is an erect, single-stemmed and monocarpic or rarely branched and polycarpic basally woody herb, producing a globe-shaped cluster of thick, spirally arranged, sword-shaped silvery-green floccose-sericeous, linear-ligulate to linear-lanceolate leaves growing in a rosette. The epigeal or nearly epigeal rosette may become 0.6 m (2 ft) or more in diameter with individual leaves up to 0.3 m (1 ft) long and is usually less than 1.3 cm (1/2 in) wide.

The leaves are completely covered with a dense layer of long silvery hairs. The leaves of all silverswords have an unusual and important ability to store water as a gel in intracellular spaces where other plant leaves contain air.

The flowering stalk, which appears a few weeks before flowering, is narrow, but may reach nearly 3 m (9.8 ft) in height. It is composed of numerous, very sticky stalklets bearing up to 600 flowering heads about 2.5 cm (31/32 in) in diameter, each containing 500 individual flowers. Each head has about a dozen pink to maroon petal-like ray flowers around its periphery.

The fruits resemble those of a sunflower, but are long and slender and are usually crowned with about 6 unequal scales less than 0.3 cm (1/8 in) in length.

The plant lives for many years until it flowers; estimates of its life span range from 5–15 years to 40 years. Flowering occurs mostly from mid-June to November. Atypical plants possess branches that flower and die independently from the main plant, so that these individuals die only after the last branch flowers.

Other subspecies

The other subspecies, A. sandwicense subsp. macrocephalum, is found in and around Haleakalā crater. They differ primarily in the inflorescence shape—broader in the Haleakalā plants (less than 4 times as long as wide), and narrower on Mauna Kea (4.3–8.6 times as long as wide). The Haleakalā subspecies also generally has more ray florets, 11–42 versus 5–20 for Mauna Kea.

== Adaptation ==
Argyroxiphium are thought to have evolved from a now-extinct species from which the current California tarweed (genus Raillardiopsis) evolved, diverging from a common mainland ancestor about 5 million or 6 million years ago. Molecular DNA research strongly supports this hypothesis. It is assumed that the colonizing individual reached Hawaiʻi on a bird's feathers, forcing "the need to seriously consider extreme long-distance dispersal of intercontinental magnitude" as the species had to overcome a dispersal barrier of at least 3,900 km (2,400 mi) of open ocean, a distance 60% greater than that separating Africa and South America.

The Mauna Kea silversword evolved to survive extraordinarily harsh subalpine conditions where virtually no other plants could grow. It possesses no protective mechanism against grazing mammals, however, which did not exist in Hawaiʻi during the millions of years of the plants' adaptation. Sherwin Carlquist, who first established the ancestral role of California tarweeds in the evolutionary history of Hawaiian silverswords, speculated that their mainland precursor species may have had a resin unappetizing to herbivores.

This is a familiar story to Hawaiian botanists; two frequently mentioned examples of a similar loss of defensive characteristics are the endemic Hawaiian raspberry (Rubus hawaiensis), which evolved to have no thorns, and endemic Hawaiian nettles that lost their sting. Without selective pressure to maintain those mechanisms, these species failed to conserve whatever protective traits their ancestors might have possessed. Protective advantage, however, favored the tarweeds and silverswords in their unique ability to store water as intracellular gel, an adaptation that would have made it possible for the species to live in arid environments.

== Original habitat ==
Historical records suggest the Mauna Kea silversword was once dominant on Mauna Kea, adapting particularly well to wind-swept exposed alpine desert at altitudes of 2,600–3,800 m (8,500–12,500 ft). In this region, humidity is virtually zero and precipitation is generally in the form of winter snow. Mean annual rainfall is less than 51–102 cm (20–40 in) per year, chiefly during the winter, with extreme drought during the summer. There is no shade from the hot tropical sun nor protection from nighttime temperatures which fall below freezing any time of year. The soil is thin, rocky, volcanic cinder. At the upper ranges of this habitat, no other plants grow.

In this seemingly inhospitable environment, Argyroxiphium thrived. Earliest accounts of the range of the Mauna Kea silversword do not suggest rarity; dead stalks were gathered for firewood by explorers in 1825. More than one anecdotal estimate made in the 1920s about the earlier population was that plants numbered in the thousands; one report was that the plants covered the slope so that the sun glared off them. The first documentation of its decline dates to 1892, when it was said to have been once abundant but is "now nearly extinct except in the most rugged and inaccessible places."

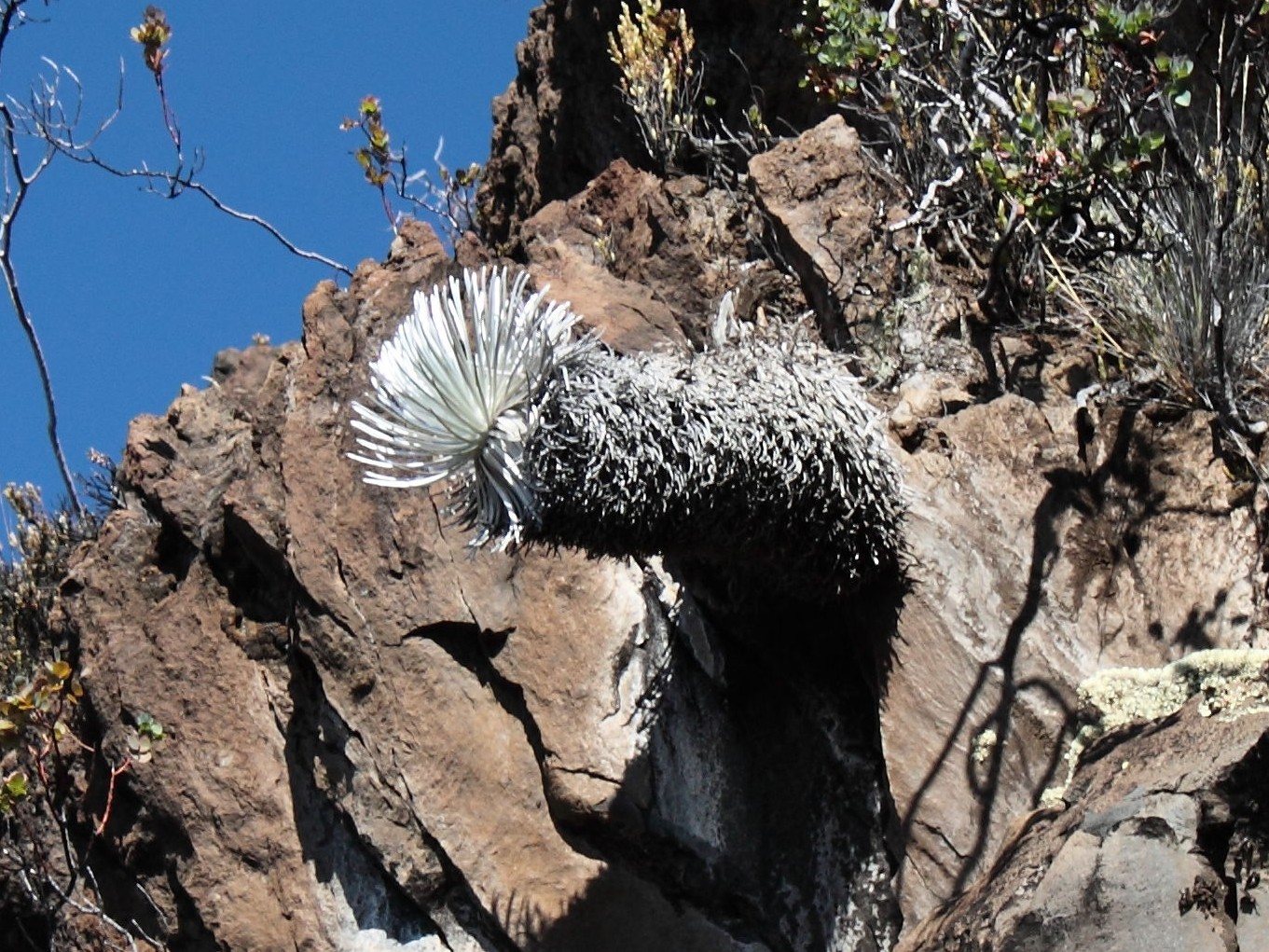
One of the last remaining wild individuals, which survived as a result of growing on a cliff out of reach of sheep.

== Near-extinction ==
The thriving population was reduced to a few individuals in 25 years by a series of land use decisions. In the 1790s, humans introduced cattle, sheep, goats, dogs and pigs to the islands. Both domestic and feral animals foraged on the open range or were fed on native plants. By 1851 there were about 3,000 feral sheep and 12,000 feral cattle on Mauna Kea. Feral dogs kept the sheep population in check until 1921, when the dogs were systematically eliminated. The population of Mauna Kea silverswords fell as the sheep population rose after 1921; live silverswords were seen only on cliffs in Puhakuloa, Waikahalulu, and Waipahoehoe Gulches. The sheep population on Mauna Kea eventually exceeded 40,000 in the 1930s, decimating the defenseless native plants including remaining silversword. Feral sheep were then greatly reduced from 1936 to 1950 but protected until 1981 as sport game in the Forest Reserve lands, which overlap the original Mauna Kea silversword habitat.

== Rescue and reintroduction ==
Initial efforts to save the Mauna Kea silversword focused on fencing off the few known remaining plants, primarily from early cultivation attempts. These attempts were ineffective in keeping out ungulates. In 1981, the state eliminated nearly all feral sheep, but a greater threat had already been introduced: mouflon sheep, brought to the island as sport game animals in 1954. More agile than feral sheep, the mouflon continued the depredation, reaching even isolated individuals, and jumping fences that had been adequate against feral sheep. Removal of these animals started in 1988. A series of ever-larger exclosures were established, and some wild individual plants were incorporated into these.

The Mauna Kea silversword was declared a federal endangered species in 1986, and only 41 naturally occurring plants survived in the wild in 2003.

=== Cultivation – first attempts ===
Propagation of the species began in the 1970s, with initially modest results. A census in 1984 found 131 plants, only 15 of which were believed to be wild and not propagated in nursery settings. The University of Hawaiʻi Botany Department has published a 1987 photo which they claim shows the only known natural population of the Mauna Kea silversword at that time, a few individuals on cliffs above the Wailuku River which were unreachable by any foraging mammals. About 1500 Mauna Kea silverswords were outplanted between 1973 and 1998. Plants were grown to flowering maturity, but starting with only one or two female parents caused a narrow genetic diversity. This was evident in the atypical trait of the offspring to produce branches. The branches could each flower independently, after which the branch, but not the plant, would die. Typical growth history of this species is to produce a single flower stalk followed by the death of the plant. By 1993, when the Bureau of Fish and Wildlife issued a recovery plan, it was apparent that a more systematic approach was needed.

=== Cultivation – increasing genetic diversity ===
To counter the effects of inbreeding, scientists began a controlled crossing program, hand-pollinating flowering silverswords in both the wild and nurseries. Despite its logistical challenges, hand pollination was judged the most likely method to achieve fertilization and increase genetic exchange between nursery and wild individuals.

Controlled propagation is used to reintroduce seedlings, since previous outplantings have an 80+% survivorship; as the plants flower only once after many years. With so few wild plants, leaving the process to a chance encounter with a suitable pollinator was considered unwise. In addition, native pollinators are thought to have been disrupted by invasive species such as Argentine ants. The native solitary Hylaeus bee genus are the pollinators of this subspecies. Nonnative honey bees (Apis mellifera) visit the flowers, but appear to steal pollen rather than move it between plants. Therefore, scientists set the policy that no seed is left in the wild.

Hand-pollination involves gathering pollen from plants living in places that even goats cannot reach, so scientists use climbing gear to lower themselves down rock faces to reach the flowering plants. There were additional complications: pollen from another silversword was required; this species cannot self-pollinate but requires a second individual for successful reproduction. The process requires a scientist to locate a blooming plant, rappel over the cliff, dangle from a rope on the rock face, gently collect in a vial the tiny yellow grains from the flower, and then find a second flowering Mauna Kea silversword. A small brush is used to paint the pollen on the flower of the second plant. If no other plant is in bloom, the pollen is stored.

=== Reintroduction – species survival ===
The wild population continued to decline rapidly. Approximately two individuals are lost every year prior to reproducing.

In 1996, two wild individuals flowered and over 3,000 individuals were reintroduced with 80+% survivorship. In 1999, more than 2500 additional silverswords were planted on Mauna Kea at multiple protected sites, and plans were in place to reintroduce more every year. However, no additional wild flowering occurred until 2005. In September 2005, 100,000 seeds were collected from hand pollinated crosses of a wild individual with several outplanted individuals.

The rate of successful reintroductions gives hope that this species might be brought back from the brink of extinction. The United States Fish and Wildlife Service reports that there are now 8,000 individuals of the species outplanted on Mauna Kea, though they were still derived from only six wild founders.
