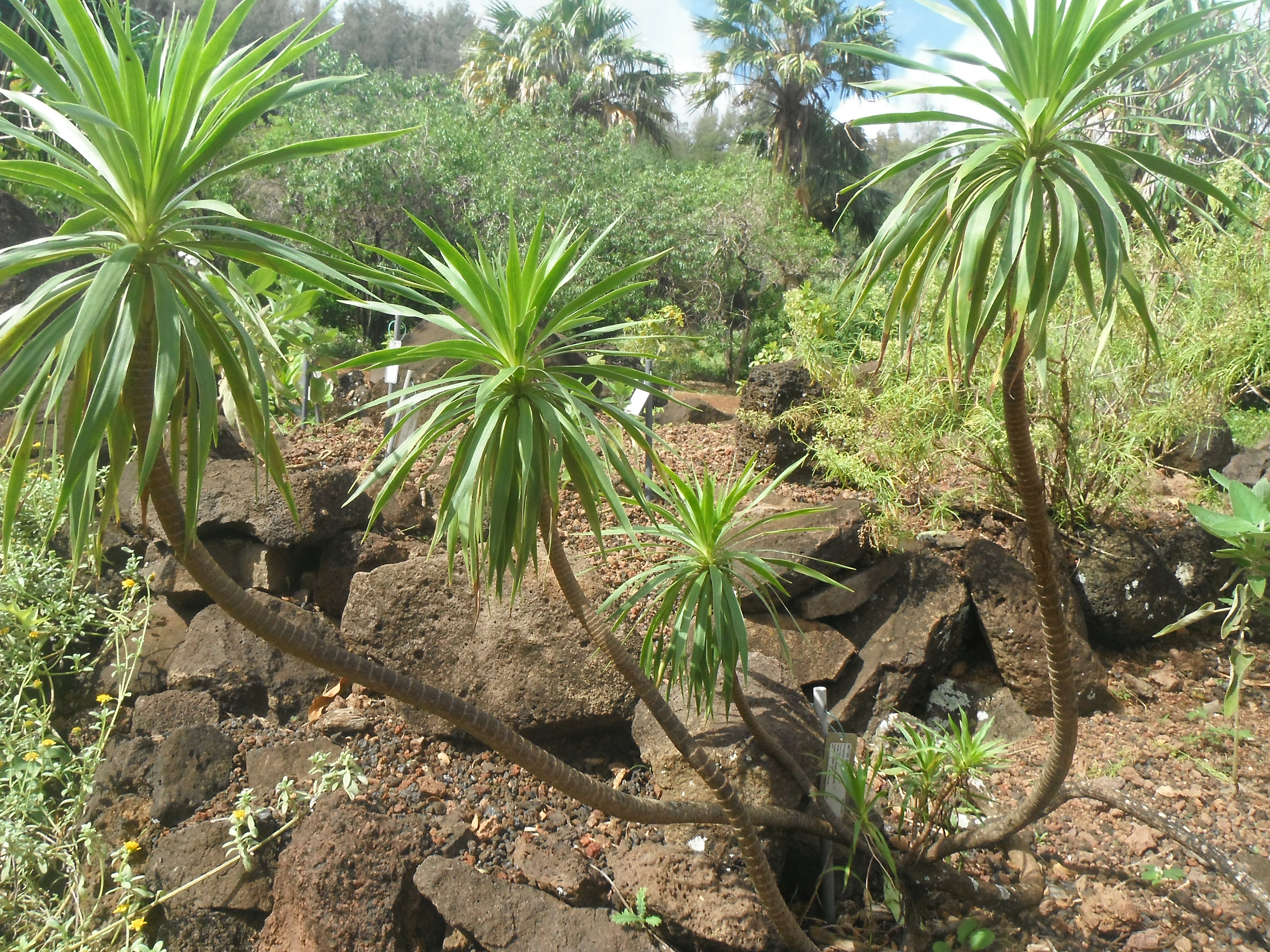

Conservation status
- Critically Imperiled (NatureServe)

Scientific classification
- Kingdom: Plantae
- Clade: Tracheophytes
- Clade: Angiosperms
- Clade: Eudicots
- Clade: Asterids
- Order: Asterales
- Family: Asteraceae
- Genus: Wilkesia
- Species: W. hobdyi

Binomial name
- Wilkesia hobdyi H.St.John, 1971

= Wilkesia hobdyi =

Species of plant

Wilkesia hobdyi, the dwarf iliau, is a species of flowering plant in the family Asteraceae that is endemic to the island of Kauaʻi in Hawaii. It was first collected in 1968, and was not formally described until 1971. The number of living plants is estimated at fewer than 300. It is considered Critically Imperiled in global rank which means it is at very high risk of extinction. It has been a federally protected species since 1992. The genus Wilkesia is one of three genera constituting the silversword alliance, a group of highly diverse yet genetically exceedingly closely related species, all thought to be descended from a colonizing ancestor related to the tarweed of North America.

== Description ==
Wilkesia hobdyi is a perennial shrub with branches reaching a length of 60 cm (24 in) extending vertically from the base. Branch tips yield whorl, rather than spirals, of narrow, flat, grass-like, somewhat thick leaves around 7.5–15 cm (3.0–5.9 in) long. Cream-colored flowers are produced in inflorescences 2 cm (0.79 in) in diameter. Flowering has been observed most often in the winter months, but also during June. This species is probably pollinated through outcrossing and is probably self-incompatible. Insects are the most likely pollinators. Wilkesia die after flowering.

== Habitat ==
Wilkesia hobdyi inhabits dry, nearly vertical rock outcroppings in the western part of the island at elevations of 275–400 m (902–1,312 ft). Rainfall in these sites is less than 1,200 ml per year.

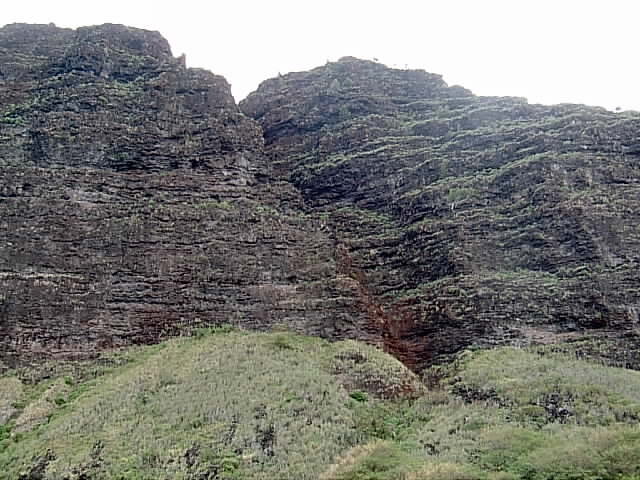
Terrain typical of W. hobdyi habitat, western Kauai

== Threats ==
The primary threat to the species is grazing by feral goats. Native species evolved in the absence of grazing animals and thus did not develop any mechanism for protection. When goats were introduced in the 18th century, many native species were devastated. The existing plants are found only on nearly vertical cliffs which even goats cannot climb. The species is also threatened by encroachment by alien plant species, especially grasses which can smother the plants. Alien grasses also pose fire hazards which endanger the plants. The other species making up the Wilkesia genus, W. gymnoxiphium, is not officially endangered, though it is also found only on Kaua'i and is not common there.

== Associated plants ==
Associated plants include ʻāhinahina (Artemisia spp.) iliau (Wilkesia gymnoxiphium), nehe (Lipochaeta connata), Lobelia niihauensis, makou (Peucedanum sandwicense), kokiʻo ʻula (Hibiscus kokio), alaheʻe (Psydrax odorata), ʻalaʻala wai nui (Peperomia spp.), naio (Myoporum sandwicense), ʻilima (Sida fallax), ʻuhaloa (Waltheria indica), ʻaʻaliʻi (Dodonaea viscosa), and kāwelu (Eragrostis variabilis).
