= Dubautia herbstobatae =

Conservation status
- Critically Imperiled (NatureServe)

Scientific classification
- Kingdom: Plantae
- Clade: Embryophytes
- Clade: Tracheophytes
- Clade: Angiosperms
- Clade: Eudicots
- Clade: Asterids
- Order: Asterales
- Family: Asteraceae
- Genus: Dubautia
- Species: D. herbstobatae

Binomial name
- Dubautia herbstobatae G.D.Carr

Synonyms
- Railliardia herbstobatae

Species of plant

Dubautia herbstobatae, the Na'ena'e or Keaau Valley dubautia, is an endangered species of shrub which is endemic to Oahu, Hawaii.

== Description ==
Dubautia herbstobatae, a member of the silversword alliance, is a spreading shrub that produces yellowish-orange flowers. Leaf size and arrangement vary from plant to plant. This shrub grows mainly in moist areas and is known to grow well on ridges and steep slopes. It is found in dry-mesic to mesic habitats. It can often be found on open, north facing rocky slopes and cliff faces. The vegetation of habitats in these locations is usually sparse shrubland and scrubby forest grounds (U.S. Fish and Wildlife Service Pacific Islands Fish and Wildlife Office).

== Distribution ==
This species is known only from Ohikilolo Ridge and Keaau Valley in the Waiʻanae Range on Oahu. The Hawaiian Islands are the most isolated islands in the world in terms of distance from other land masses. The Hawaiian Islands also have a high diversity of habitat types. This isolation is part of the reasoning behind the Dubautia herbstobatae and other Hawaiian species being included on the Endangered Species List. There is a limited amount of habitat appropriate for island species.

== Conservation ==
Dubautia herbstobatae was listed as an endangered species by the US Government in 1991. At the time, fewer than 100 of the plants existed. With the implementation of a management plan, that number rose to roughly 500. The number has again grown, and current estimate of the population is around 1,200 individuals.

=== Threats ===
The two main forces threatening D. herbstobatae are habitat destruction, especially by wildfire, and introduced species, particularly feral hogs and goats.

Stochastic events in the small populations that make up the species include environmental threats such as invasion of the habitat by tourists and catastrophes such as fire and landslides.

=== Management ===
Current research areas involving D. herbstobatae include population estimates, estimates of destruction, success rate of plants reintroduced into the habitat, and the changing roles of the plant's threats. The Pacific Islands Fish and Wildlife Office of the United States Fish and Wildlife Service has developed and implemented a plan to monitor this endangered species. It has designated critical habitat for Dubautia herbstobatae in two units totaling 198 acres (0.80 km^{2}) on Oahu. The land consists of habitat on both state and private land. This land can be more easily monitored for threats to the species.

Recovery objectives include maintaining at least three naturally reproducing populations. When this objective is met, the species will be classified as stable. Actions include seed collection for genetic storage, fencing select patches of plants within populations for short-term protection, surveying for populations in historical sites and suitable habitat, studying D. herbstobatae populations with regard to population size and structure, geographical distribution, flowering cycles, pollination vectors, seed dispersal agents, longevity, specific environmental requirements, limiting factors and threats, and reintroducing individuals into suitable habitat.

The U.S. Army is scheduled to manage the Makua Valley and the Makaha side of Kamaileunu Ridge in Hawaii. Currently, the U.S. Army is focusing on two largest populations at Ohikilolo. The goal of the U.S. Army monitoring these areas is to completely eradicate the goats in these areas. The Army has also put up a fence that runs along the southern perimeter of the Makua Valley to prevent goats from entering from adjacent valleys.
