= Johann Berger (disambiguation) =

Johann Berger may refer to:

- Johann Berger (1845–1933), Austrian chess master, theorist, endgame study composer, author, and editor
- Johann Gottfried von Berger (1659–1736), German physician
- Johann Nepomuk Berger (politician) (1816–1870), Austrian lawyer, politician, and writer
- Johann Berger (footballer) (born 1999), German footballer

== See also ==
- Johannes Berger (died 1481), Roman Catholic prelate
