= Dubautia kalalauensis =

Conservation status
- Critically Imperiled (NatureServe)

Scientific classification
- Kingdom: Plantae
- Clade: Tracheophytes
- Clade: Angiosperms
- Clade: Eudicots
- Clade: Asterids
- Order: Asterales
- Family: Asteraceae
- Genus: Dubautia
- Species: D. kalalauensis

Binomial name
- Dubautia kalalauensis B.G.Baldwin & G.D.Carr

Species of plant

Dubautia kalalauensis is a rare species of flowering plant in the family Asteraceae. It is endemic to Hawaii where it is known only from the island of Kauai. There is only a single known population composed of 26 plants. It was federally listed as an endangered species of the United States in 2010. Like other Dubautia this plant is known as na`ena`e.

This member of the silversword alliance was part of Dubautia laxa until 2005, when it was separated and described as a new species. The population grows in wet mountain forest habitat in the understory of ʻōhiʻa lehua (Metrosideros polymorpha) trees in Kalalau Valley on Kauai.

This plant is a shrub or tree with oppositely arranged leaves and flower heads which contain green-tinged cream-colored flowers.
