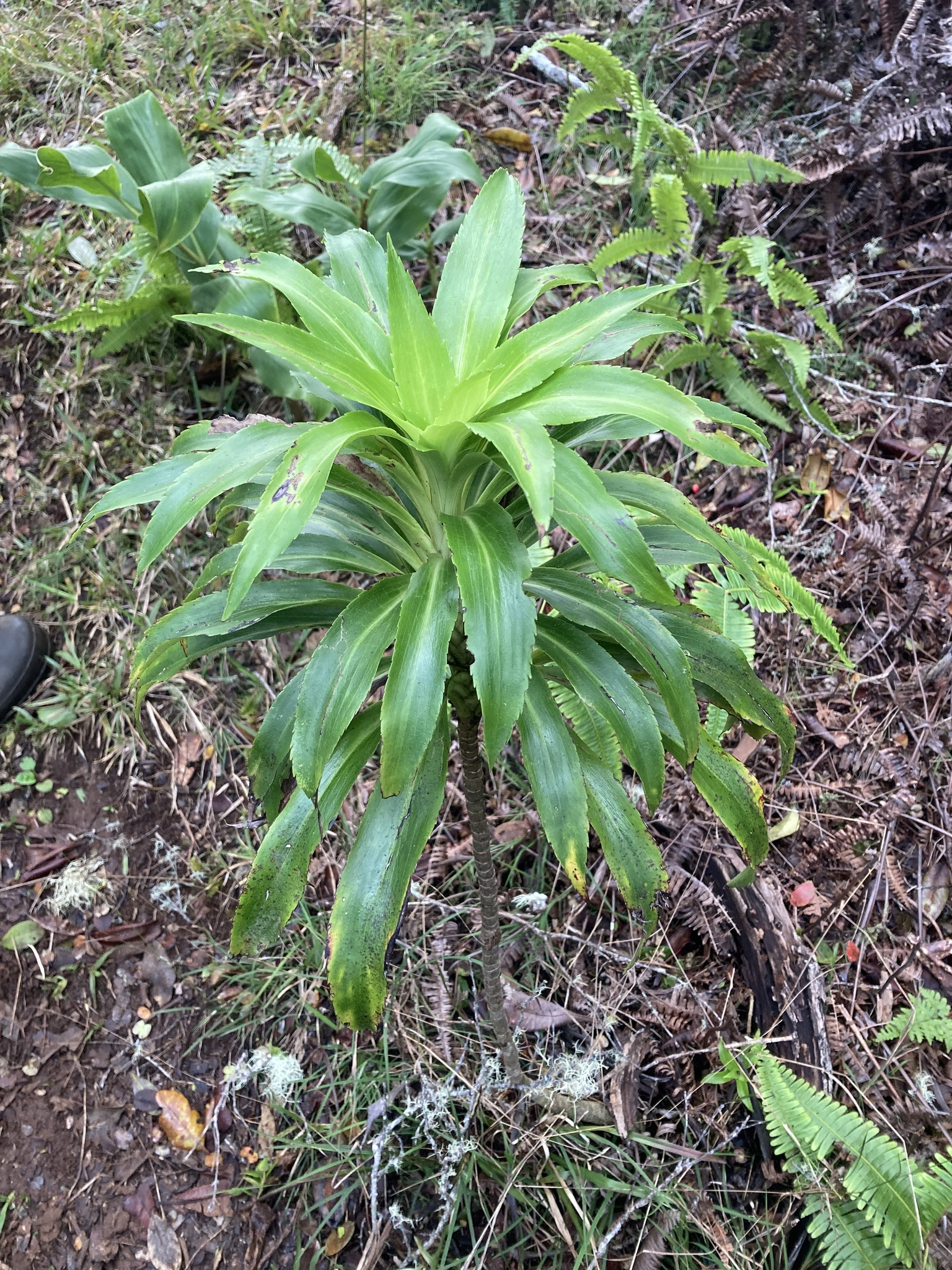
- Growing in a native forest near the Alaka'i plateau in central Kauaʻi

Conservation status
- Endangered (IUCN 3.1)

Scientific classification
- Kingdom: Plantae
- Clade: Tracheophytes
- Clade: Angiosperms
- Clade: Eudicots
- Clade: Asterids
- Order: Asterales
- Family: Asteraceae
- Genus: Dubautia
- Species: D. laevigata

Binomial name
- Dubautia laevigata A. Gray
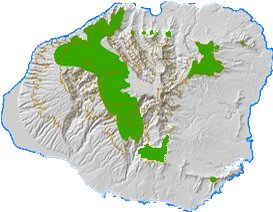
- Native range

= Dubautia laevigata =

Species of plant

Dubautia laevigata, commonly known as the smooth dubautia, is a species of Dubautia endemic to moderate elevations on the island of Kauaʻi in Hawaii, United States. A member of the Silversword alliance, it only grows in the understory of mesic Hawaiian tropical rainforests. It is declining in population and is threatened by the spread of invasive species, with approximately 5500 individuals remaining.

== Description ==
Dubuatia laevigata is a shrub that grows up to 2.5 m (8 ft 2 in) high with a compact woody stem. It has large, shiny green leaves 7–24 cm (2.8–9.4 in) long and 0.8–3.5 cm (0.31–1.38 in) wide. The margins of the leaves are serrate. Flowers are small (2.5–3 mm (0.098–0.118 in) long) and appear in clusters of 2–5, with yellow corollas, and mostly appear between December and August.

== Distribution and habitat ==
Dubuatia laevigata is only found at medium elevations of 575–1,250 m (1,886–4,101 ft) in mesic wet forests on the island of Kauaʻi. It is absent from the highest elevations of the Alaka'i plateau.
