= Dubautia latifolia =

Conservation status
- Critically Endangered (IUCN 3.1)

- Critically Imperiled (NatureServe)

Scientific classification
- Kingdom: Plantae
- Clade: Tracheophytes
- Clade: Angiosperms
- Clade: Eudicots
- Clade: Asterids
- Order: Asterales
- Family: Asteraceae
- Genus: Dubautia
- Species: D. latifolia

Binomial name
- Dubautia latifolia (A.Gray) D.D.Keck

Species of plant

Dubautia latifolia is a rare species of flowering plant in the family Asteraceae known by the common name koholapehu. It is endemic to Hawaii where it is known only from the west side of the island of Kauai. Like other Dubautia this plant is called na`ena`e.

== Distribution ==
Dubautia latifolia, a member of the silversword alliance, grows in scattered locations in the moist and wet forests near Waimea Canyon on Kauai. The habitat receives up to 190 centimeters of precipitation annually. The forest is dominated by koa (Acacia koa), ohia (Metrosideros polymorpha) and uluhe (Dicranopteris linearis). It is found in the Kokee area of northwestern Kauai, which is found in Kokee State Park. It grows at elevations from 3,200 to 3,900 ft (980 to 1,190 m). It was first collected in 1840.

There are no more than 200 individuals remaining. There are about 18 occurrences, but most of these are made up of only one or two plants.

== Description ==
Dubautia latifolia is a liana which can exceed 8 metres (26 ft) in length. It climbs trees, reaching several meters up into the canopy. Blooming occurs in September through November, when the plant produces panicles of yellow flowers. The fruit is a cypsela, but could be mistaken for an achene.

Dubautia latifolia can be distinguished from other species in its genus by its vine growing habits, and having different petioles and net-veins of the leaves.

== Conservation ==
Dubautia latifolia was federally listed as an endangered species of the United States in 1992.

The very low seed count in wild plants shows that there might be a reproduction problem. Seedlings and young plants are not commonly seen. Banana poka (Passiflora tarminiana), an invasive vine, is one of the most dangerous species when it comes to Dubautia latifolia conservation. The vine kills D. latifolia trees by completely covering their canopies with heavy vines. It also faces threats from illegal marijuana cultivation, which not only destroys natural habitat, but also could further bring invasive species into the area.

Threats to this species and its habitat include feral pigs, feral goats, rats, and deer. Invasive plant species that threaten it include Santa Barbara daisy (Erigeron karvinskianus), kahili ginger (Hedychium spp.), lantana (Lantana camara), airplant (Kalanchoe pinnata) and firetree (Myrica faya). Conservation efforts include the collection of seeds and the planting of young plants in appropriate habitat.
