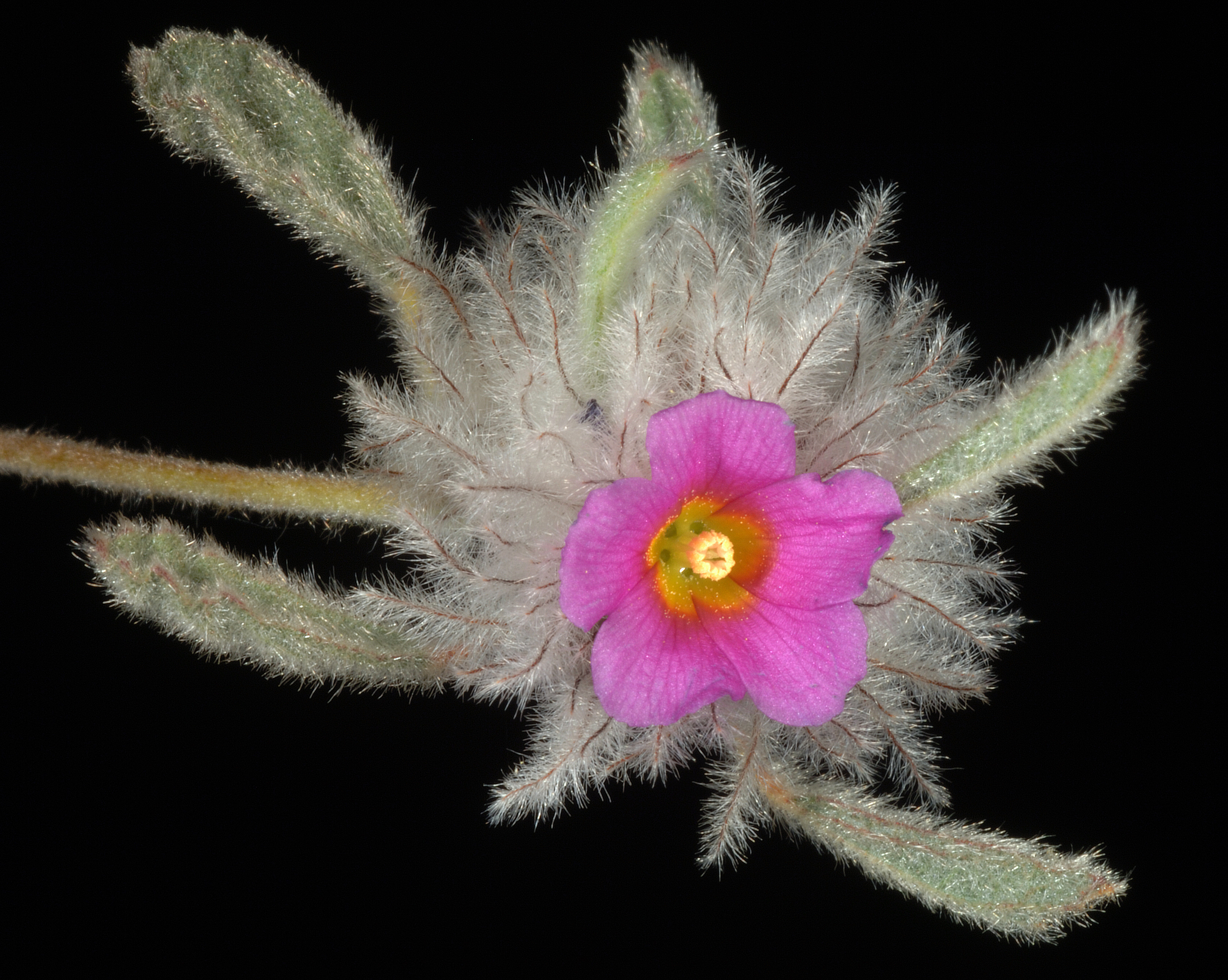

Scientific classification
- Kingdom: Plantae
- Clade: Tracheophytes
- Clade: Angiosperms
- Clade: Eudicots
- Clade: Rosids
- Order: Malvales
- Family: Malvaceae
- Genus: Waltheria
- Species: W. virgata

Binomial name
- Waltheria virgata Ewart & Cookson

= Waltheria virgata =

Species of flowering plant

Waltheria virgata is a species of flowering plant in the mallow family, Malvaceae, that is found in the north of Western Australia, and in the Northern Territory.

== Description ==
Waltheria virgata is an erect, much branched shrub growing from a height of 0.3 m to 1 m high, and up to 1 m wide. Its leaves and stems are thinly to densely covered in stellate (star-shaped) hairs. Its pink-purple flowers may be seen from April to May or July to October.

== Habitat ==
It grows on red sand and stony soils, on plains, on rocky hills, and in stony creeks.

== Taxonomy and naming ==
It was first described in 1917 by Alfred James Ewart & Isabel Clifton Cookson. There are no synonyms. The specific epithet, virgata, derives from the Latin word, virga, "a rod for beating", to give a Botanical Latin adjective describing the plant as having "straight slender not very flexible twigs". The genus name, Waltheria, honours the German botanist Augustin Friedrich Walther.
