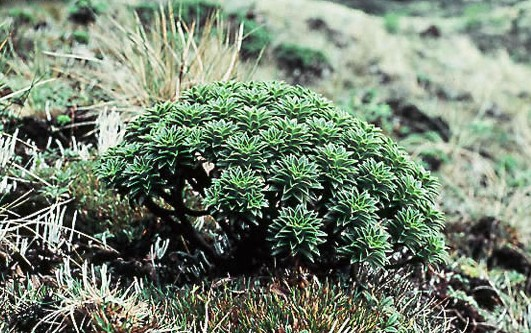

Conservation status
- Critically Imperiled (NatureServe)

Scientific classification
- Kingdom: Plantae
- Clade: Tracheophytes
- Clade: Angiosperms
- Clade: Eudicots
- Clade: Asterids
- Order: Asterales
- Family: Asteraceae
- Genus: Dubautia
- Species: D. waialealae

Binomial name
- Dubautia waialealae Rock

= Dubautia waialealae =

Species of plant

Dubautia waialealae is a rare species of flowering plant in the family Asteraceae known by the common name Wai'ale'ale dubautia. Like other Dubautia this plant is called na`ena`e.

== Distribution and habitat ==
Dubautia waialealae is endemic to Hawaii, where it is known only from Mount Waiʻaleʻale on Kauai. One individual was seen outside the range, about 14 kilometers away, but this plant is now dead. A recent count estimates a total population of about 3000 plants.

The plant grows in boggy wet forest habitat on the mountain summit that is considered one of the rainiest spots on earth, if not the rainiest. It grows in habitat around the famous Mount Waiʻaleʻale rain gauge, which measures 460 inches (38.3 feet) of rain in an average year, its distribution extending a short way down the slopes of the mountain.

== Description ==
Dubautia waialealae, a distinctive member of the silversword alliance, takes the form of a dense, rounded, cushionlike clump 10 to 50 centimeters tall. The leaves are borne in tightly packed whorls. Yellow flowers are borne in heads. Blooming occurs in August through November.

== Conservation ==
Threats to this rare localized endemic plant include damage to the habitat by feral pigs, feral goats, and invasive plant species such as Juncus planifolius and Andropogon virginicus. It was federally listed as an endangered species of the United States in 2010.
