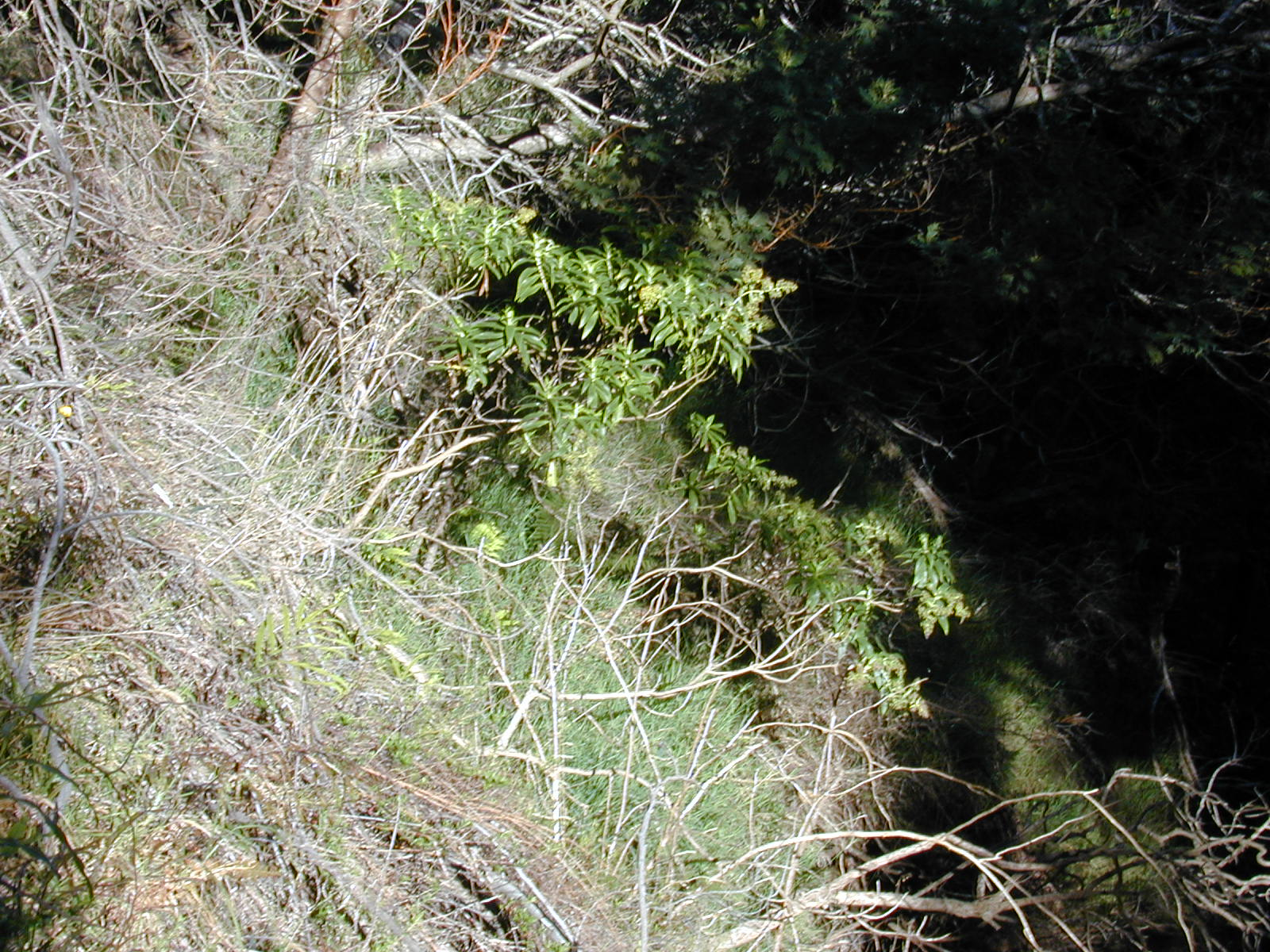
- Dubautia plantaginea subsp. plantaginea on Maui

Conservation status
- Vulnerable (NatureServe)

Scientific classification
- Kingdom: Plantae
- Clade: Tracheophytes
- Clade: Angiosperms
- Clade: Eudicots
- Clade: Asterids
- Order: Asterales
- Family: Asteraceae
- Genus: Dubautia
- Species: D. plantaginea

Binomial name
- Dubautia plantaginea Gaudich.

= Dubautia plantaginea =

Species of plant

Dubautia plantaginea is a rare species of flowering plant in the aster family known by the common name plantainleaf dubautia. It is endemic to Hawaii where it is the only member of the silversword alliance that is found on all six of the largest islands (Kauaʻi, O'ahu, Moloka'i, Lana'i, Maui, Hawai'i). Two of the three subspecies are rare and endangered. Like other Dubautia this plant is called na`ena`e.

This plant varies in morphology, taking the form of a small shrub to a tree up to 7 meters tall. There are three subspecies. The dwarf subspecies, ssp. humilis, is endemic to Maui, where there is only one population consisting of about 50 plants. This subspecies was federally listed as an endangered species in 1999. The ssp. magnifolia is a shrub or a tree which is endemic to Kauaʻi, where there are no more than 2 populations remaining. It was listed as endangered in 2010.

These plants grow in moist and wet forest habitat with 75 to over 700 centimeters of precipitation annually.

Threats to this species and its habitat include landslides, rockslides, erosion, flooding, and invasive plant species such as hilo grass (Paspalum conjugatum). The ssp. magnifolia was decimated by Hurricane Iniki in 1992.
