= Dubautia imbricata =

Conservation status
- Critically Imperiled (NatureServe)

Scientific classification
- Kingdom: Plantae
- Clade: Tracheophytes
- Clade: Angiosperms
- Clade: Eudicots
- Clade: Asterids
- Order: Asterales
- Family: Asteraceae
- Genus: Dubautia
- Species: D. imbricata

Binomial name
- Dubautia imbricata H.St.John & G.D.Carr

Species of plant

Dubautia imbricata is a rare species of flowering plant in the family Asteraceae known by the common names bog dubautia and imbricate dubautia. It is endemic to Hawaii where it is known only from the island of Kauai. There are four known occurrences. Like other Dubautia this plant is known as na`ena`e.

This member of the silversword alliance was first described to science in 1981 after it was discovered in a Kauaian rainforest. It grows in just a few spots in boggy forest habitat in the understory of ʻōhiʻa lehua (Metrosideros polymorpha) trees among sedges in the genera Oreobolus and Rhynchospora.

There are two subspecies. Both are rare and ssp. imbricata was federally listed as an endangered species of the United States in 2010.

This plant is a clumpy, bushy shrub which reaches 2.5 metres (8 ft 2 in) tall by 2 metres (6 ft 7 in) wide. The oppositely arranged leaves are up to 15 centimetres (6 in) long by 2.5 centimetres (1 in) wide. The inflorescence is a cluster of many flower heads, each of which contains several yellow flowers.

Both subspecies are known to hybridize with other Dubautia.
