= Dubautia pauciflorula =

Conservation status
- Critically Imperiled (NatureServe)

Scientific classification
- Kingdom: Plantae
- Clade: Tracheophytes
- Clade: Angiosperms
- Clade: Eudicots
- Clade: Asterids
- Order: Asterales
- Family: Asteraceae
- Genus: Dubautia
- Species: D. pauciflorula

Binomial name
- Dubautia pauciflorula H.St.John & G.D.Carr

Species of plant

Dubautia pauciflorula is a rare species of flowering plant in the family Asteraceae known by the common name Wahiawa Bog dubautia. It is endemic to Hawaii where it is known only from the Wahiawa Mountains on the island of Kauai.

Fewer than 50 individuals are remaining. It was federally listed as an endangered species of the United States in 1991. Like other Dubautia this plant is called na`ena`e.

This member of the silversword alliance was first collected in 1909, and again in 1911, but it went without a name for many decades. It was not collected again until 1979, and it was finally described as a new species in 1981. It grows in wet rainforest habitats near streams. The area receives up to 500 centimetres (200 in) of precipitation annually. This plant is a shrub growing up to 3 metres (9 ft 10 in) tall by 3 metres (9 ft 10 in) wide, with smooth, oppositely arranged leaves. Yellow flowers are borne in heads of two to four.

Threats to this species and its habitat include feral pigs and invasive plant species such as Melastoma candidum. Conservation efforts include the collection of seeds.
