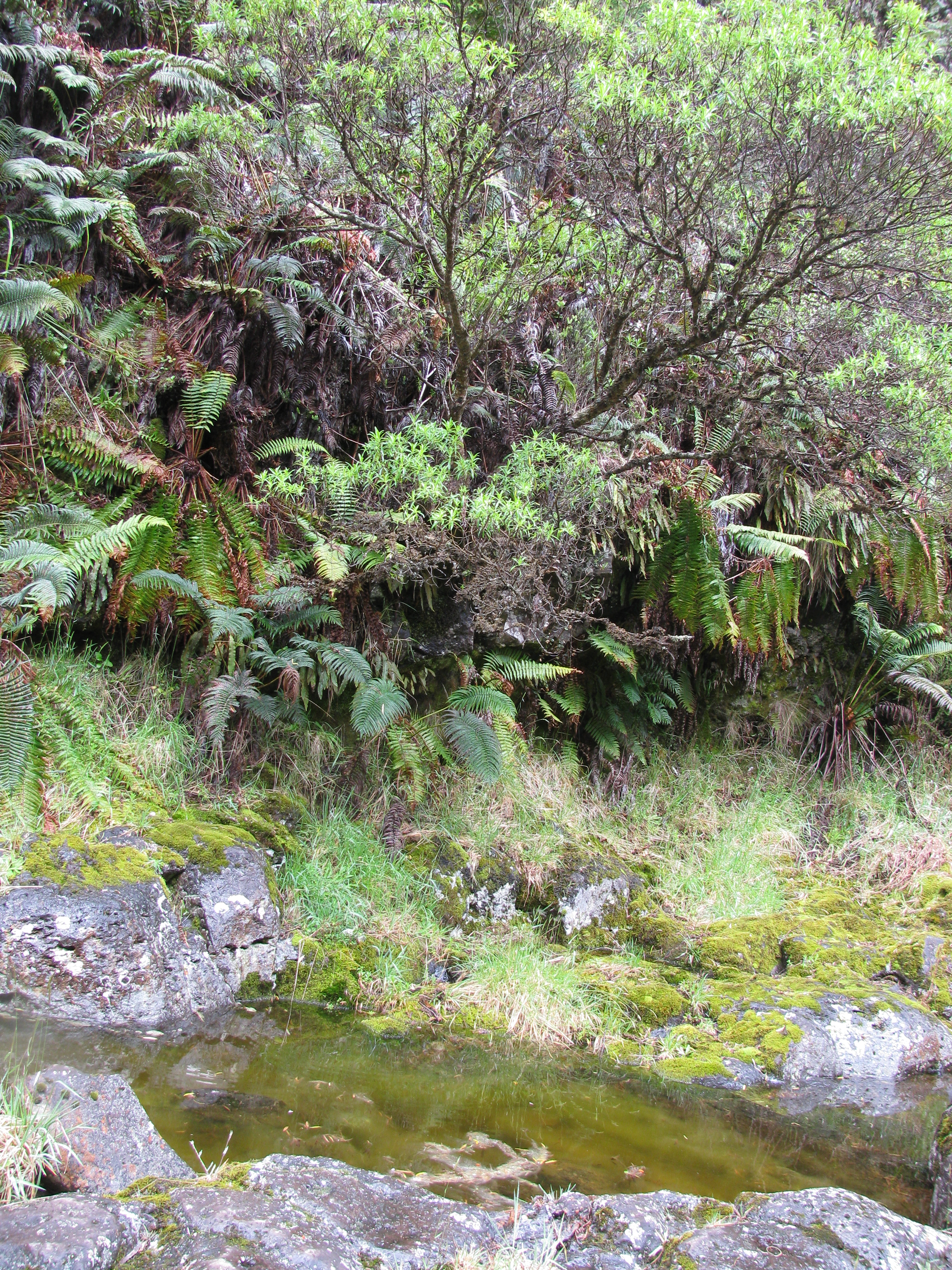
- Dubautia reticulata in Maui

Conservation status
- Vulnerable (IUCN 2.3)

Scientific classification
- Kingdom: Plantae
- Clade: Tracheophytes
- Clade: Angiosperms
- Clade: Eudicots
- Clade: Asterids
- Order: Asterales
- Family: Asteraceae
- Genus: Dubautia
- Species: D. reticulata

Binomial name
- Dubautia reticulata (Sherff) Keck

= Dubautia reticulata =

Species of plant

Dubautia reticulata, the net-veined dubautia, is a species of flowering plant in the family Asteraceae that is endemic to the island of Maui in Hawaii. It is threatened by habitat loss.
