= Augustin Friedrich Walther =

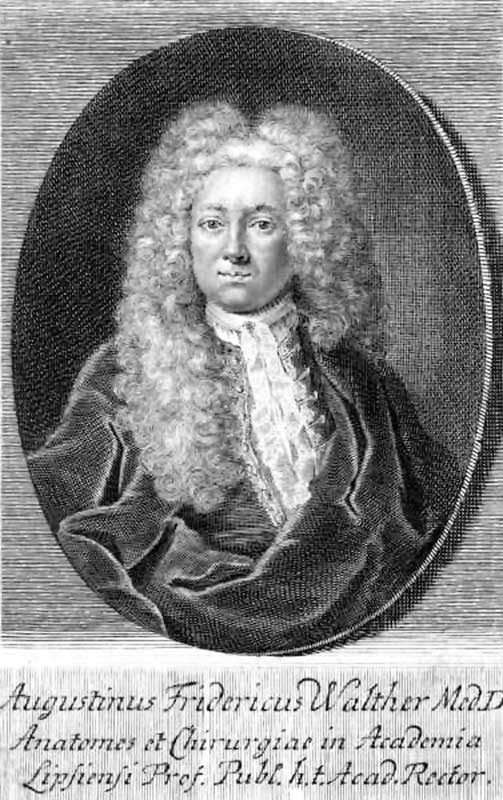
- Born: 26 October 1688; Wittenberg, Electorate of Saxony
- Died: 12 October 1746 (aged 57); Leipzig, Electorate of Saxony
- Scientific career
- Fields: Physics; Botany; Anatomy
- Doctoral advisor: Johann Gottfried von Berger
- Notable students: Christian Gottlieb Ludwig

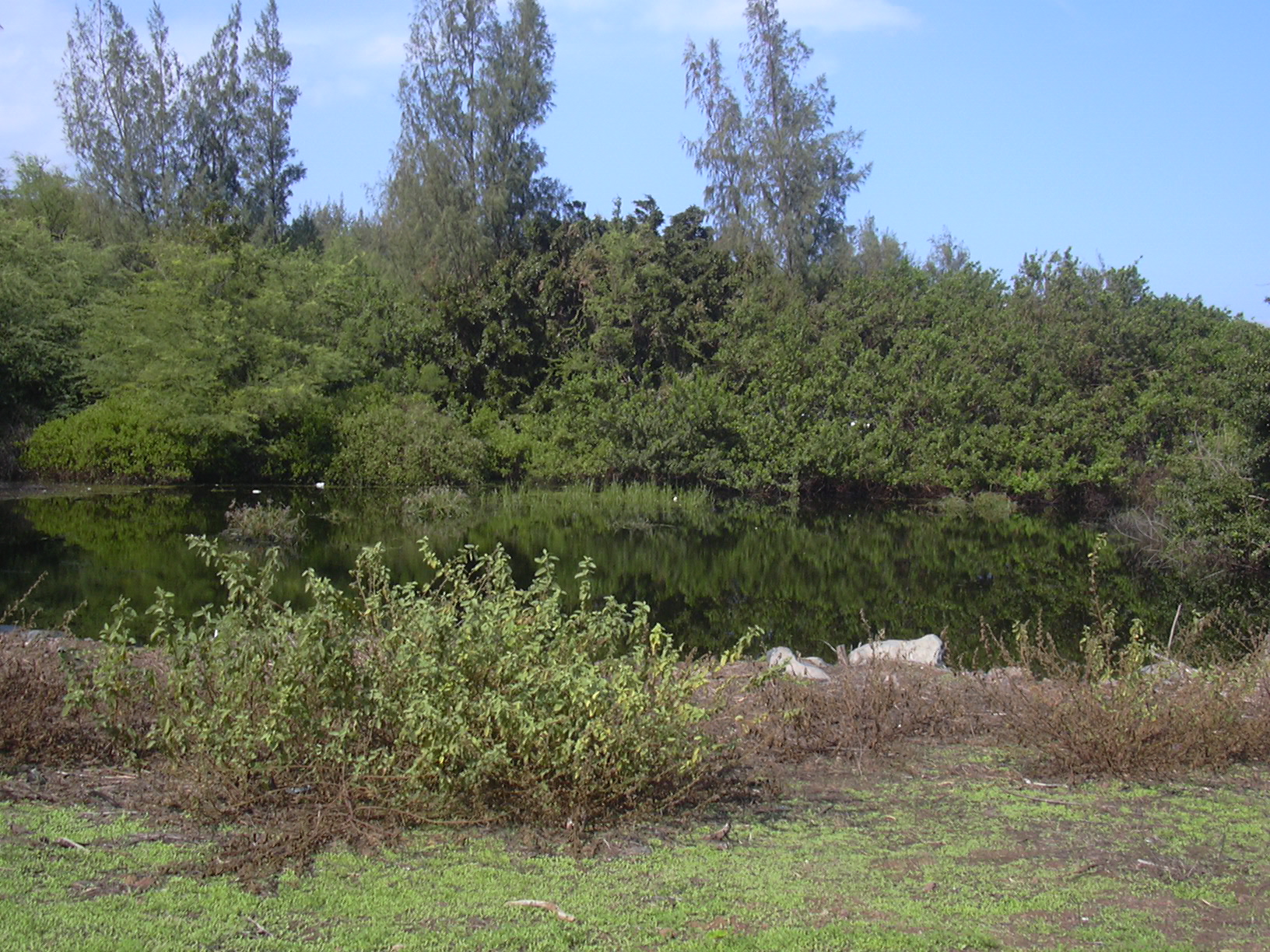
Waltheria indica (habit near wetland). Location: Maui, Kanaha Beach

Augustin Friedrich Walther (26 October 1688 – 12 October 1746) was a German anatomist, botanist and physician who was a native of Wittenberg, Electorate of Saxony. He was the son of theologian Michael Walther the Younger (1638–1692).

In 1712 he earned his degree of philosophy from the University of Wittenberg, and in the following year received his medical doctorate from the University of Leipzig. At Leipzig he became a professor of anatomy (1728), pathology (1732) and therapy (1737). In 1730 he became director of the Leipzig Botanical Gardens, and in 1737 was rector at the university.

Among his numerous writings was a 1735 botanical treatise called Designatio plantarum quas hortus AF Waltheri complectitur, in which he provides descriptions of thousands of plant species from his private botanical garden. As a physician he made contributions in the fields of myology and angiology, and has several medical and anatomical terms named after him, including:

- "Walther's dilator": An instrument used for dilation of the female urethra.
- "Walther's ducts": Also known as minor sublingual ducts.
- "Walther's ganglion": Also known as the coccygeal ganglion.
- "Walther's plexus": Also known as the intracavernous plexus; which is the portion of the internal carotid plexus in the cavernous sinus.

The plant genus Waltheria from the family Sterculiaceae is named after him.

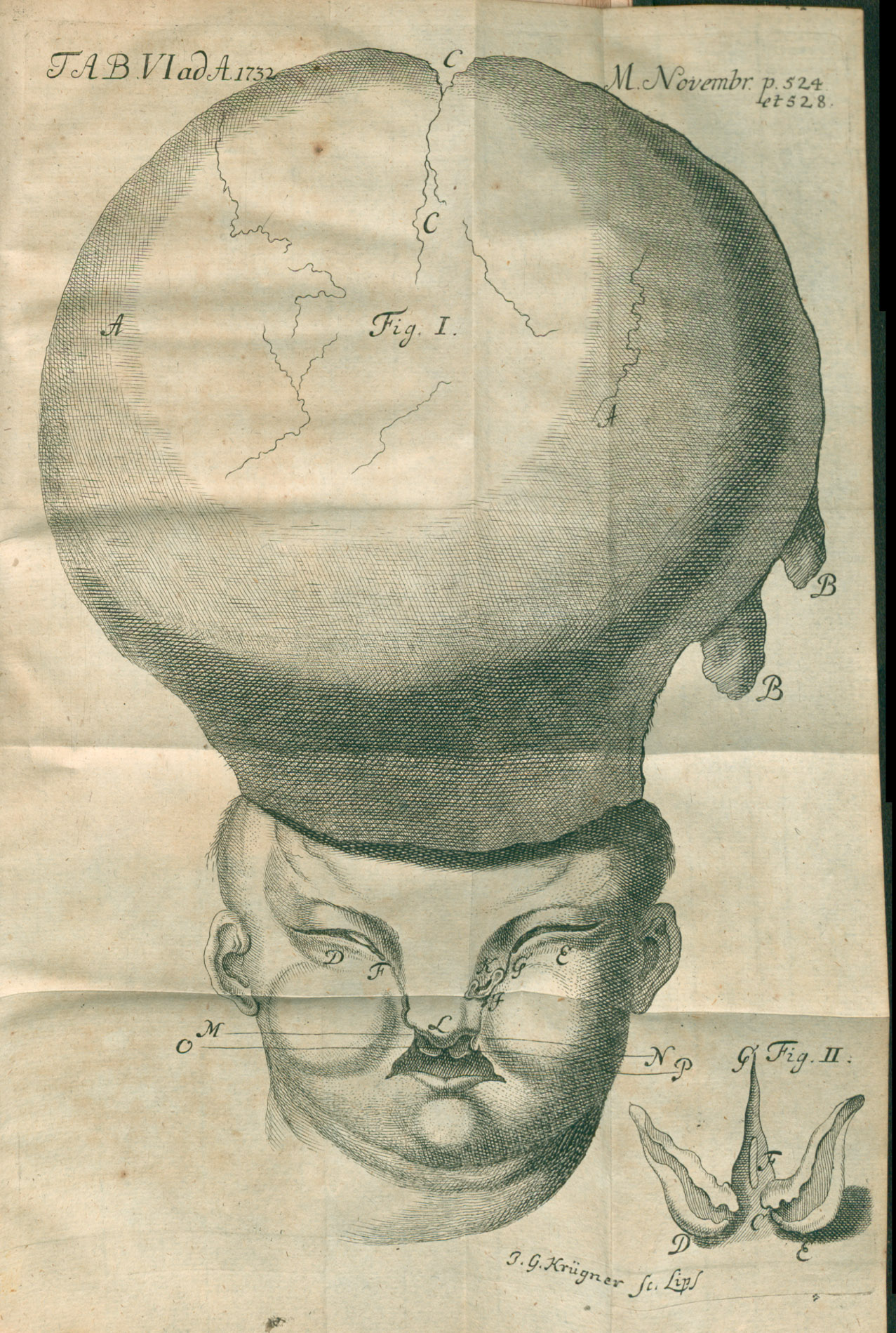
Illustration from critique of Partus monstruosi published in Acta Eruditorum, 1732

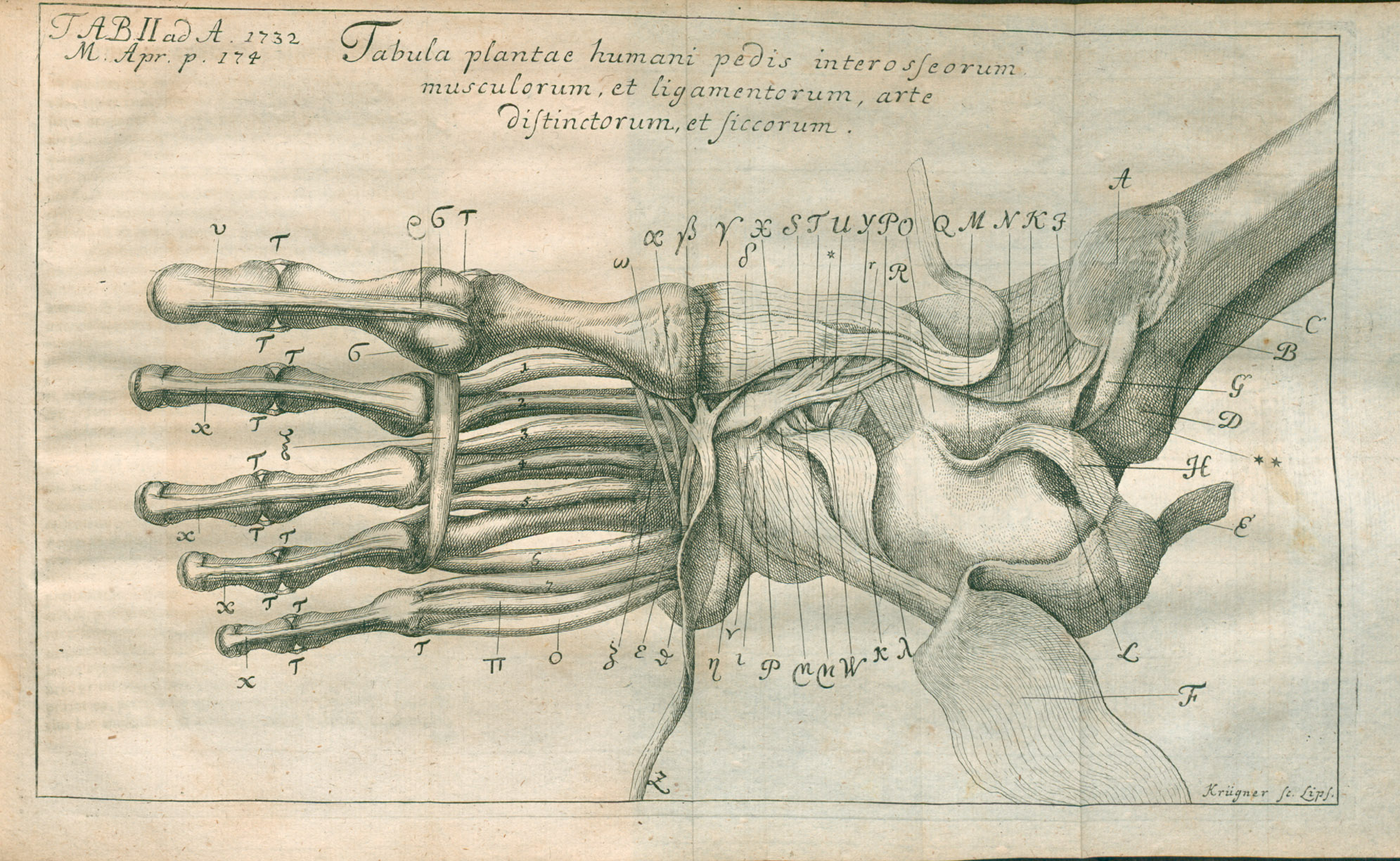
Illustration from Supplementum tractationis de articulis, ligamentis, ... published in Acta Eruditorum, 1732
