= Mesic habitat =

Habitat with moderate moisture

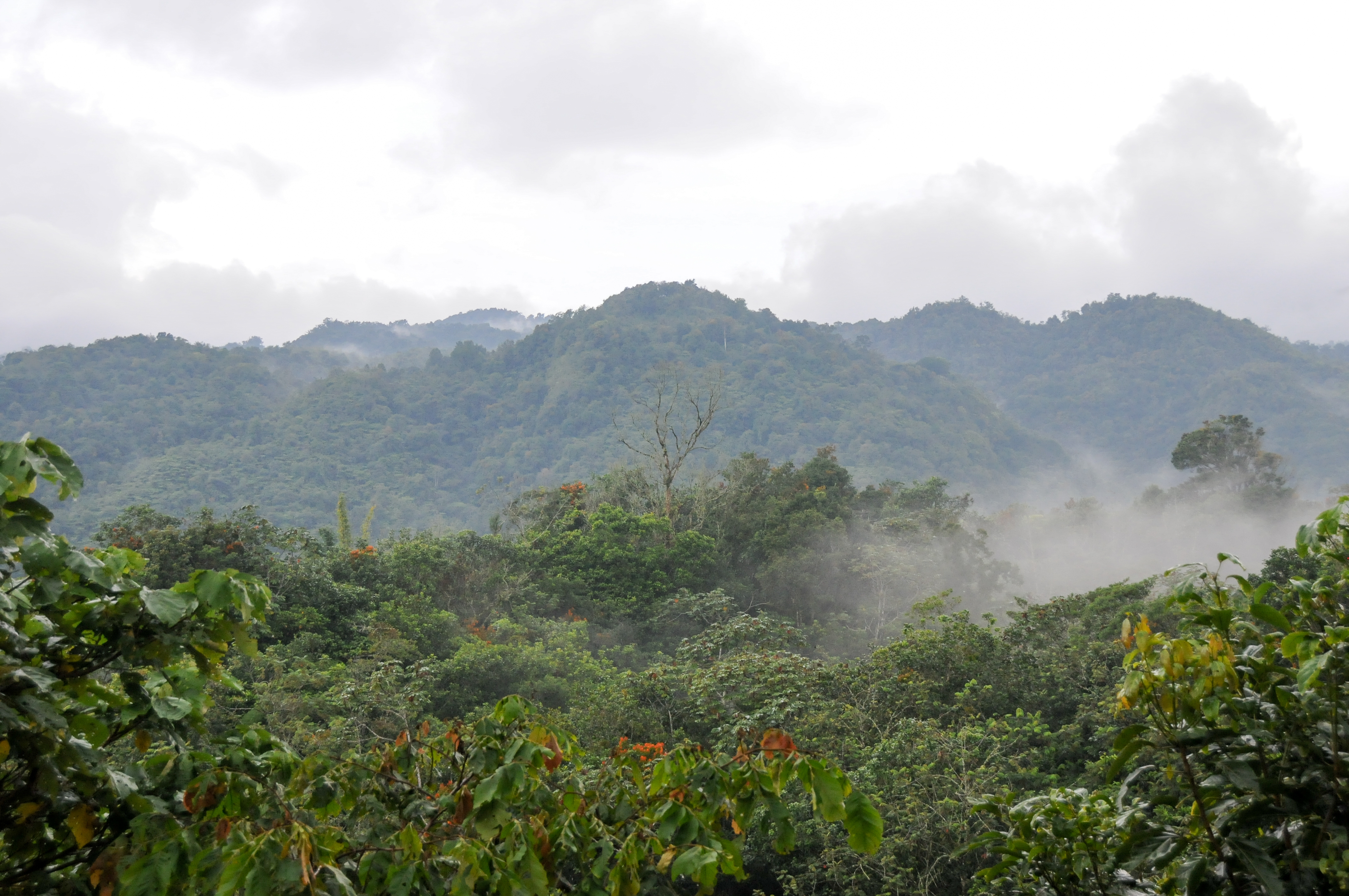
Mesic forest in Puebla, Mexico

In ecology, a mesic habitat is a type of habitat with a well-balanced or moderate supply of moisture throughout the growing season (e.g., a mesic forest, temperate hardwood forest, or dry-mesic prairie). The term derives from the Greek mesos, meaning middle, indicating its relative moisture content between hydric (moist) and xeric (dry) habitats. The word "mesic" can apply to the plants or soils within the mesic habitat (i.e. mesic plants, mesic soils).

Mesic habitats provide a moderate moisture content that remains relatively constant during crucial growing periods. A variety of outside factors contribute to the presence of water in the system, including streams and their offshoots, wet meadows, springs, seeps, irrigated fields, and high-elevation habitats. These factors effectively provide drought insurance during the growing season against climatic factors such as increasing temperatures, lack of rain, and the effects of urbanization.

Other habitat types, such as mesic hammocks, occupy the middle ground between bottomlands and sandhills or clay hills. These habitats can often be governed by oaks, hickories, and magnolias. However, there are some habitats that exhibit adaptations to fire. Natural Pinelands can persist in conjunction with mesic (moderately drained) or hydric but can also include mesic clay.

Healthy mesic habitats can store large amounts of water given the typical rich loamy soil composition and streams, springs, etc. This allows the entire habitat to essentially function like a sponge storing water in such a way that it can be deposited to neighboring habitats as needed. This supply helps to capture, store, and slowly release water. This supply aids in nutrient facilitation, bolstering community interactions.

Mesic habitats are common in dryer regions of the western United States, such as the Great Basin, Great Plains, and the Rocky Mountains, where they serve as water sources for neighboring dry climates and desert habitats. Healthy mesic habitats can provide extensive benefits to surrounding communities and habitats for both biotic and abiotic factors. This boost in reserve water allows for ecological processes to commence and provide balance and nutrients for energy to flow through the ecosystem at hand.

An important type of plant that resides within mesic habitats is the forb, which provides a strong source of food for many species, especially avian species such as the ruffed grouse. These habitats play an important role in the distribution abundance of sage grouse, influencing where they choose their breeding grounds, or leks.

Mesic habitats are stressed by various human activities such as ranching; however, many conservation efforts are underway. As of 2010, over 1,474 ranchers have agreed to partner with the Sage Grouse Initiative under the U.S. Department of Agriculture to protect over 5.6 million acres of mesic habitat. The Working Lands for Wildlife organization has developed an interactive app to visualize mesic resources. The SGI Interactive Web App provides users with local conservation efforts across the entire range of sage grouse. Preservation of mesic habitats will promote stability and success within the established ecosystem.

== See also ==
- Tugai
