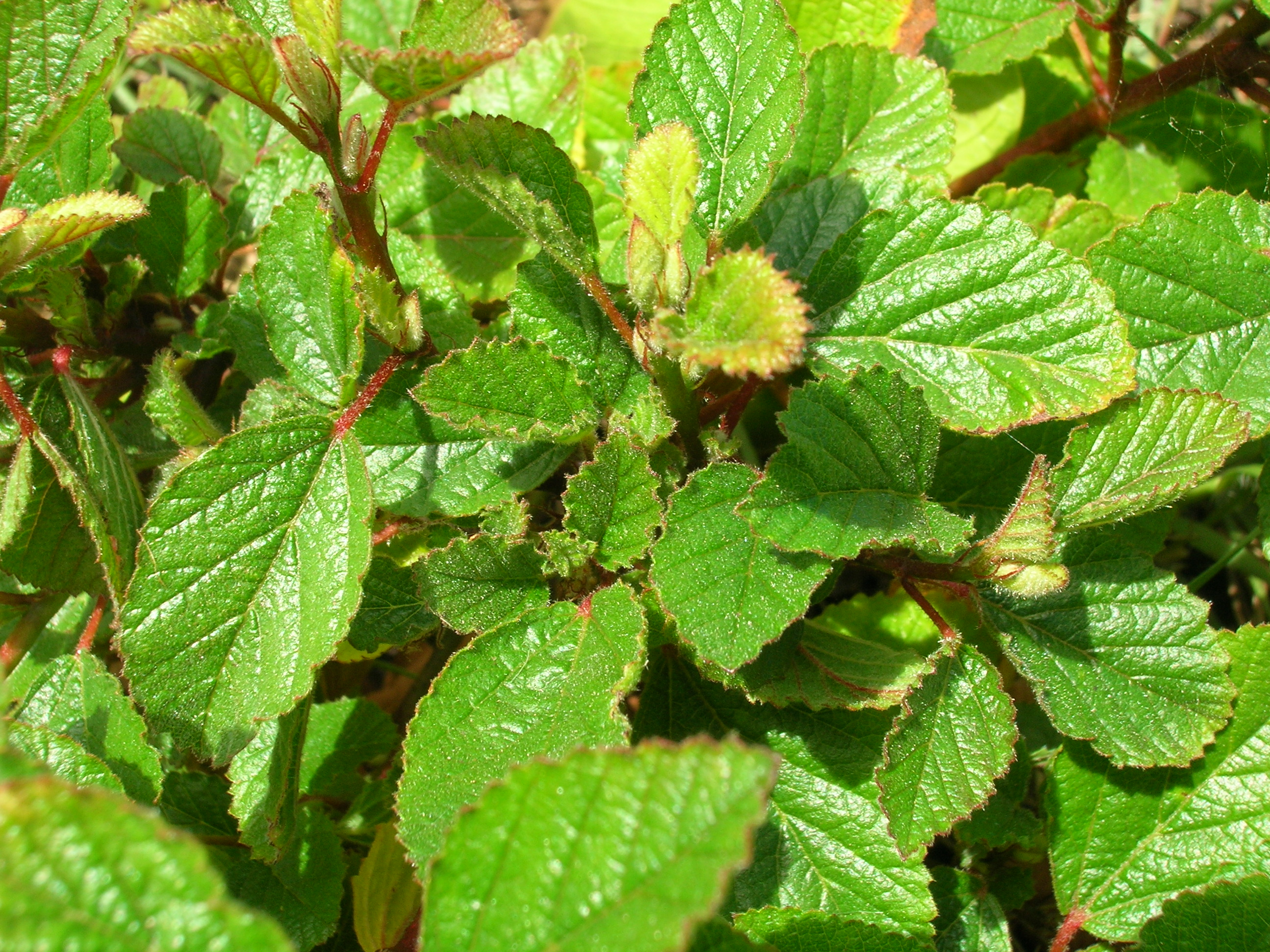
- Waltheria indica

Scientific classification
- Kingdom: Plantae
- Clade: Tracheophytes
- Clade: Angiosperms
- Clade: Eudicots
- Clade: Rosids
- Order: Malvales
- Family: Malvaceae
- Subfamily: Byttnerioideae
- Tribe: Hermannieae
- Genus: Waltheria; L.

Species
- See text

Synonyms
- Astropus Spreng.; Lophanthus J.R.Forst. & G.Forst., nom. illeg.; Sitella L.H.Bailey

= Waltheria =

Genus of flowering plants

Waltheria is a genus of flowering plants in the mallow family, Malvaceae. It is sometimes placed in Sterculiaceae. It includes 61 species native to the tropical and subtropical Americas, West Africa, Madagascar, Peninsular Malaysia, northern Australia, and the central Pacific. The name honours German botanist Augustin Friedrich Walther (1688–1746).

== Species ==
61 species are accepted.

- Waltheria acapulcensis Rose
- Waltheria ackermanniana K.Schum.
- Waltheria acuminata Rose
- Waltheria albicans Turcz.
- Waltheria arenaria Ridl.
- Waltheria arenicola A.Rodr.
- Waltheria bahamensis Britton
- Waltheria belizensis J.G.Saunders
- Waltheria berteroi (Spreng.) J.G.Saunders
- Waltheria bicolor J.G.Saunders
- Waltheria biribiriensis J.G.Saunders ex T.S.Coutinho & Colli-Silva
- Waltheria brachypetala Turcz.
- Waltheria bracteosa A.St.-Hil. & Naudin
- Waltheria calcicola Urb. – Raichie
- Waltheria carmensarae J.G.Saunders
- Waltheria carpinifolia A.St.-Hil. & Naudin
- Waltheria cinerescens A.St.-Hil.
- Waltheria collina K.Schum.
- Waltheria communis A.St.-Hil.
- Waltheria conzattii Standl.
- Waltheria coriacea J.G.Saunders
- Waltheria detonsa A.Gray
- Waltheria excelsa Turcz.
- Waltheria ferruginea A.St.-Hil.
- Waltheria flavovirens J.G.Saunders
- Waltheria fryxellii J.G.Saunders
- Waltheria glabra Poir.
- Waltheria glabribracteata T.S.Coutinho & M.Alves
- Waltheria glazioviana K.Schum.
- Waltheria glomerata C.Presl
- Waltheria hatschbachii J.G.Saunders
- Waltheria hoehnei J.G.Saunders
- Waltheria indica L. – Basora-prieta, ʻuhaloa
- Waltheria involucrata Benth.
- Waltheria ladewii Rusby
- Waltheria lanceolata R.Br. ex Mast.
- Waltheria lundelliana J.G.Saunders
- Waltheria macrophylla Hassl.
- Waltheria madagascariensis (DC.) Hochr.
- Waltheria marielleae T.S.Coutinho & M.Alves
- Waltheria maritima A.St.-Hil.
- Waltheria matogrossensis J.G.Saunders
- Waltheria microphylla Cav.
- Waltheria operculata Rose
- Waltheria ovata Cav.
- Waltheria petiolata K.Schum.
- Waltheria polyantha K.Schum.
- Waltheria preslii Walp.
- Waltheria pringlei Rose & Standl.
- Waltheria procumbens J.G.Saunders & Soria
- Waltheria pyrolifolia A.Gray
- Waltheria rotundifolia Schrank
- Waltheria saundersiae T.S.Coutinho & M.Alves
- Waltheria scabra (Colla) P.L.R.Moraes & Guglielmone
- Waltheria selloana K.Schum.
- Waltheria terminans J.G.Saunders ex T.S.Coutinho & Colli-Silva
- Waltheria tomentosa (J.R.Forst. & G.Forst.) H.St.John
- Waltheria tridentata J.G.Saunders
- Waltheria vernonioides R.E.Fr.
- Waltheria virgata Ewart & Cookson
- Waltheria viscosissima A.St.-Hil.
