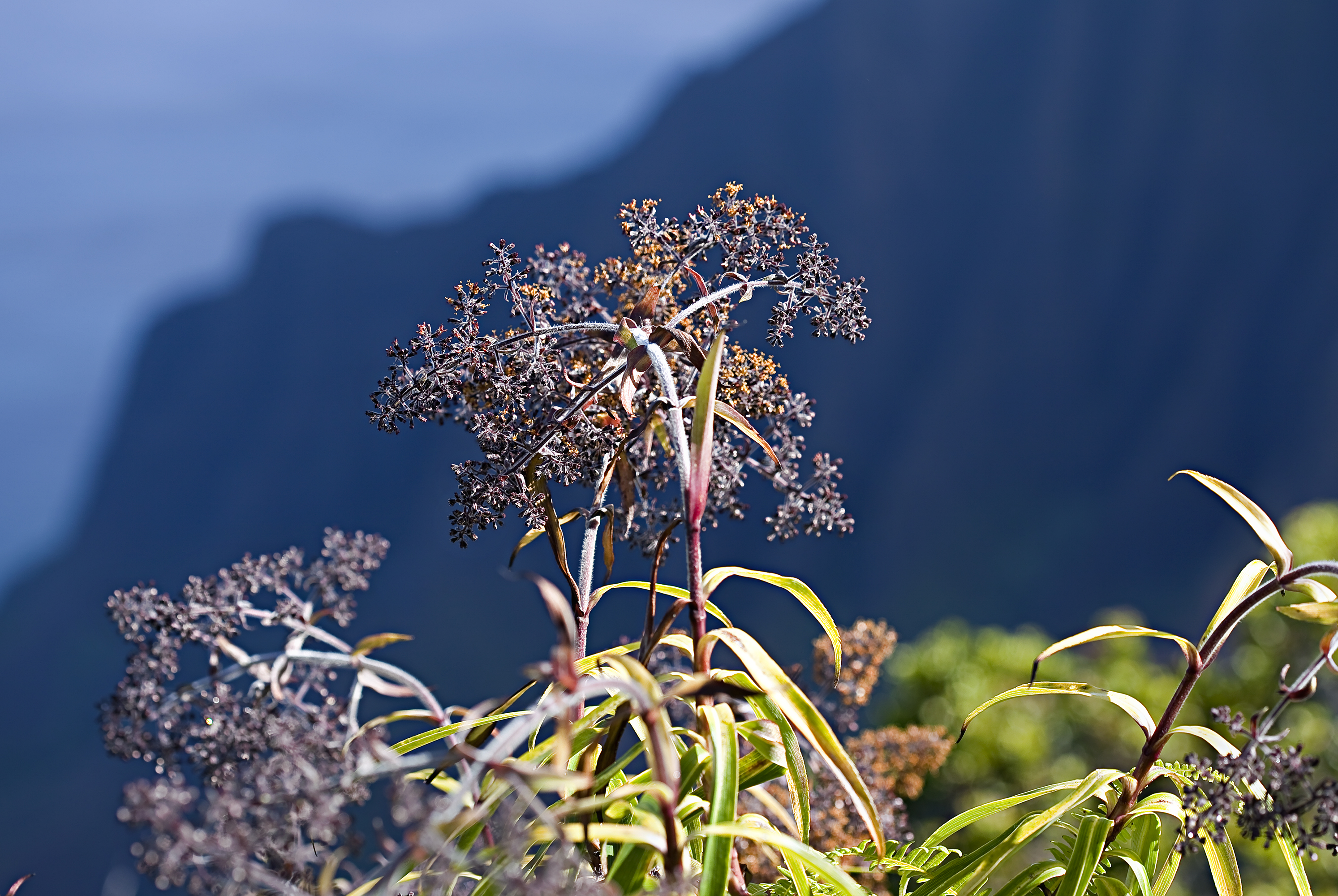

Conservation status
- Critically Endangered (IUCN 3.1)

Scientific classification
- Kingdom: Plantae
- Clade: Tracheophytes
- Clade: Angiosperms
- Clade: Eudicots
- Clade: Asterids
- Order: Asterales
- Family: Asteraceae
- Genus: Dubautia
- Species: D. microcephala

Binomial name
- Dubautia microcephala Skottsberg

= Dubautia microcephala =

Species of plant

Dubautia microcephala, the small-head dubautia, is a species of flowering plant in the family Asteraceae. It is endemic to the island of Kauai in Hawaii. It is a perennial shrub or tree that grows up to 10 ft (3.0 m) tall.
