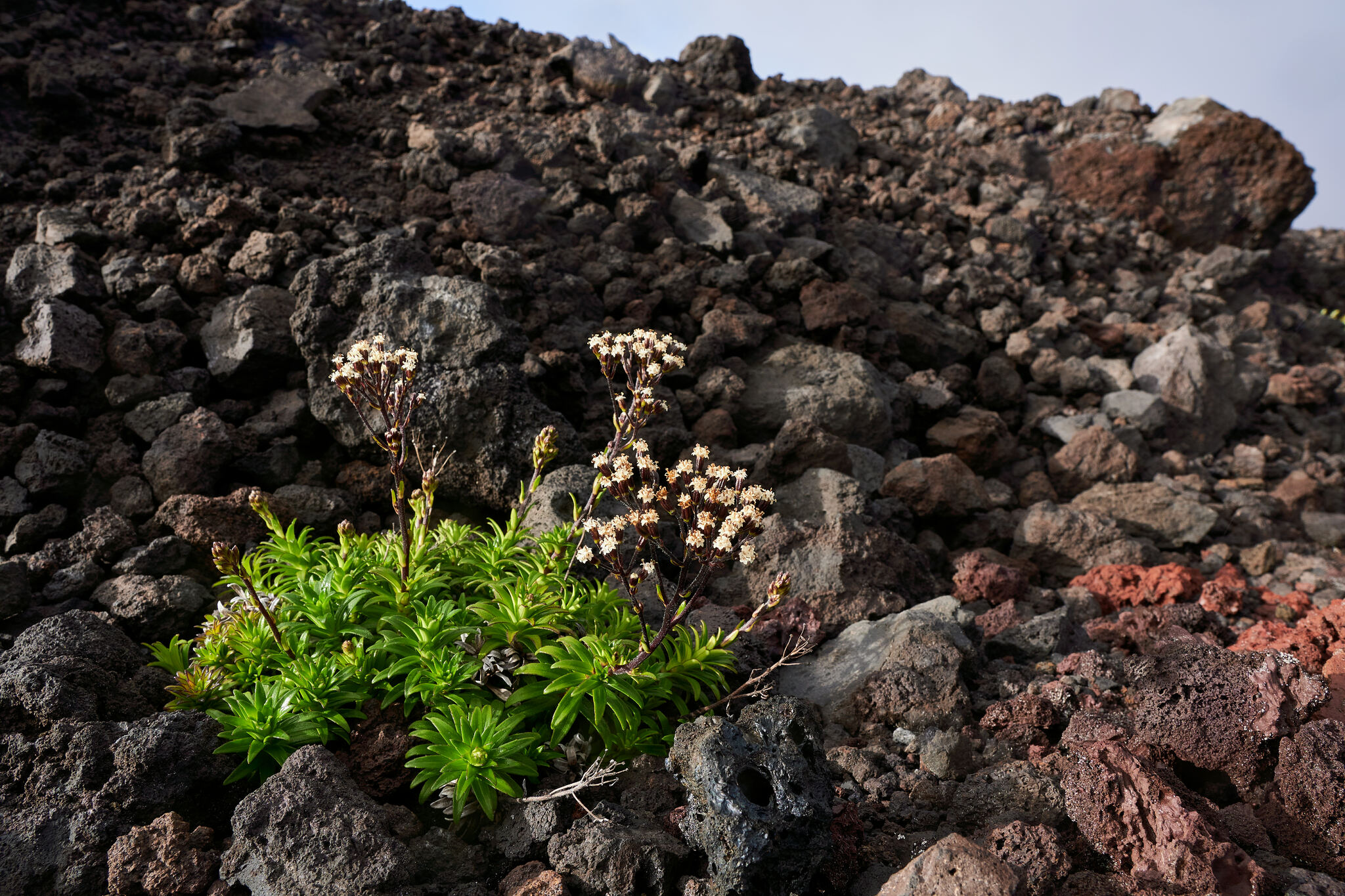
- Growing on a lava flow produced by a Mauna Loa eruption in 1935

Conservation status
- Vulnerable (NatureServe)

Scientific classification
- Kingdom: Plantae
- Clade: Tracheophytes
- Clade: Angiosperms
- Clade: Eudicots
- Clade: Asterids
- Order: Asterales
- Family: Asteraceae
- Genus: Dubautia
- Species: D. scabra

Binomial name
- Dubautia scabra (DC.) D.D.Keck
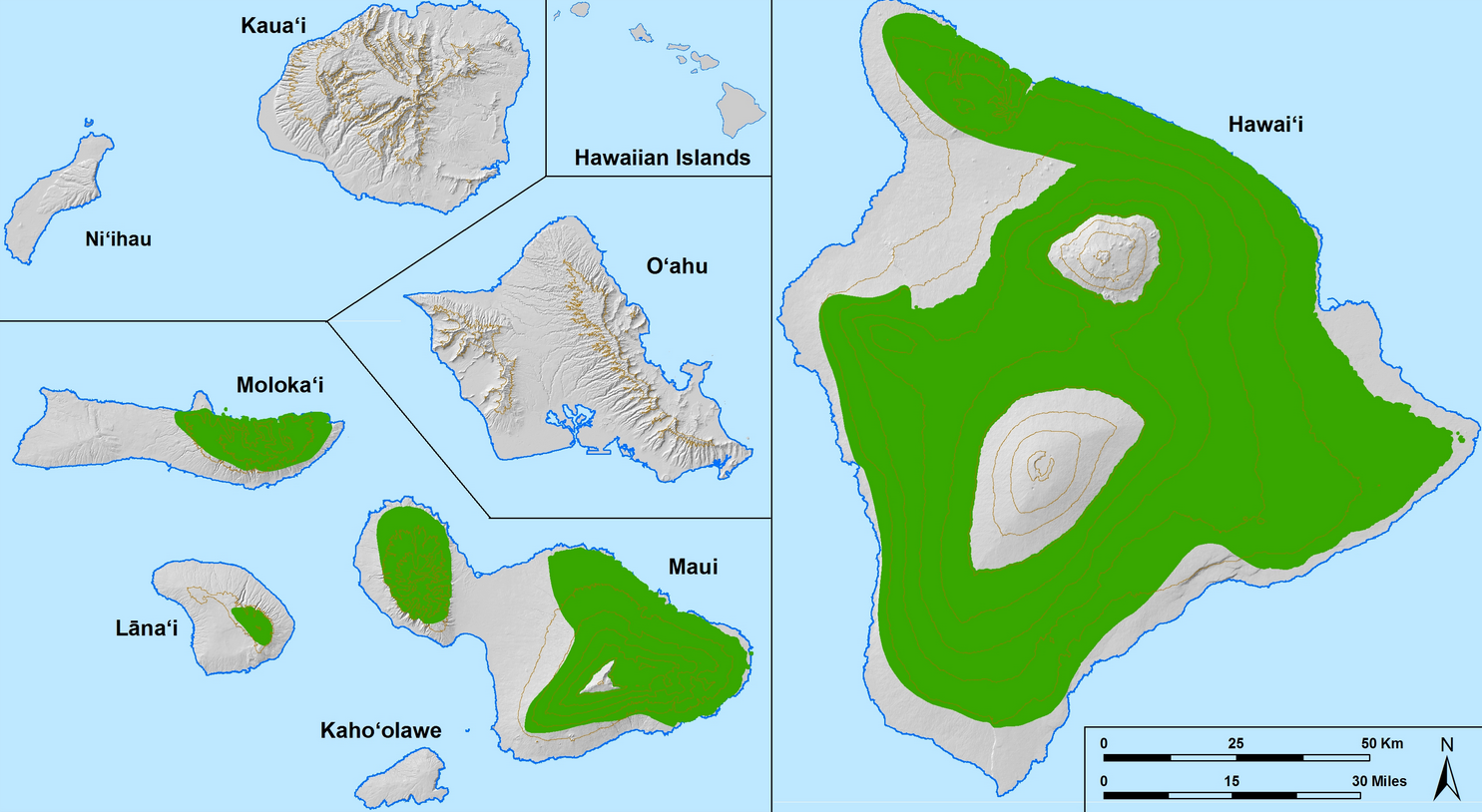
- Native range

= Dubautia scabra =

Species of plant

Dubautia scabra, or rough dubautia, is a species of Dubautia endemic to the state of Hawai'i and is found on the islands of Hawaii (island), Maui, Molokai, and Lanai. It is a member of the silversword alliance. Two subspecies have been described, with the nominate subspecies Dubautia scabra scabra being found only on Maui and Hawaii (island).

== Description ==
Dubautia scabra grows as a shrub with circular rosettes of leaves. It sometimes becomes mat-forming. Flowers are white, with blooming occurring at any time most frequently in the summer.

== Distribution and habitat ==
Dubautia scabra occupies low and moderate elevations on the islands where it occurs, growing at elevations between 75–2500 m. It often grows on barren lava flows, but can also be found in wet tropical rainforests, with the subspecies leiophylla most frequently found in the latter habitat.
