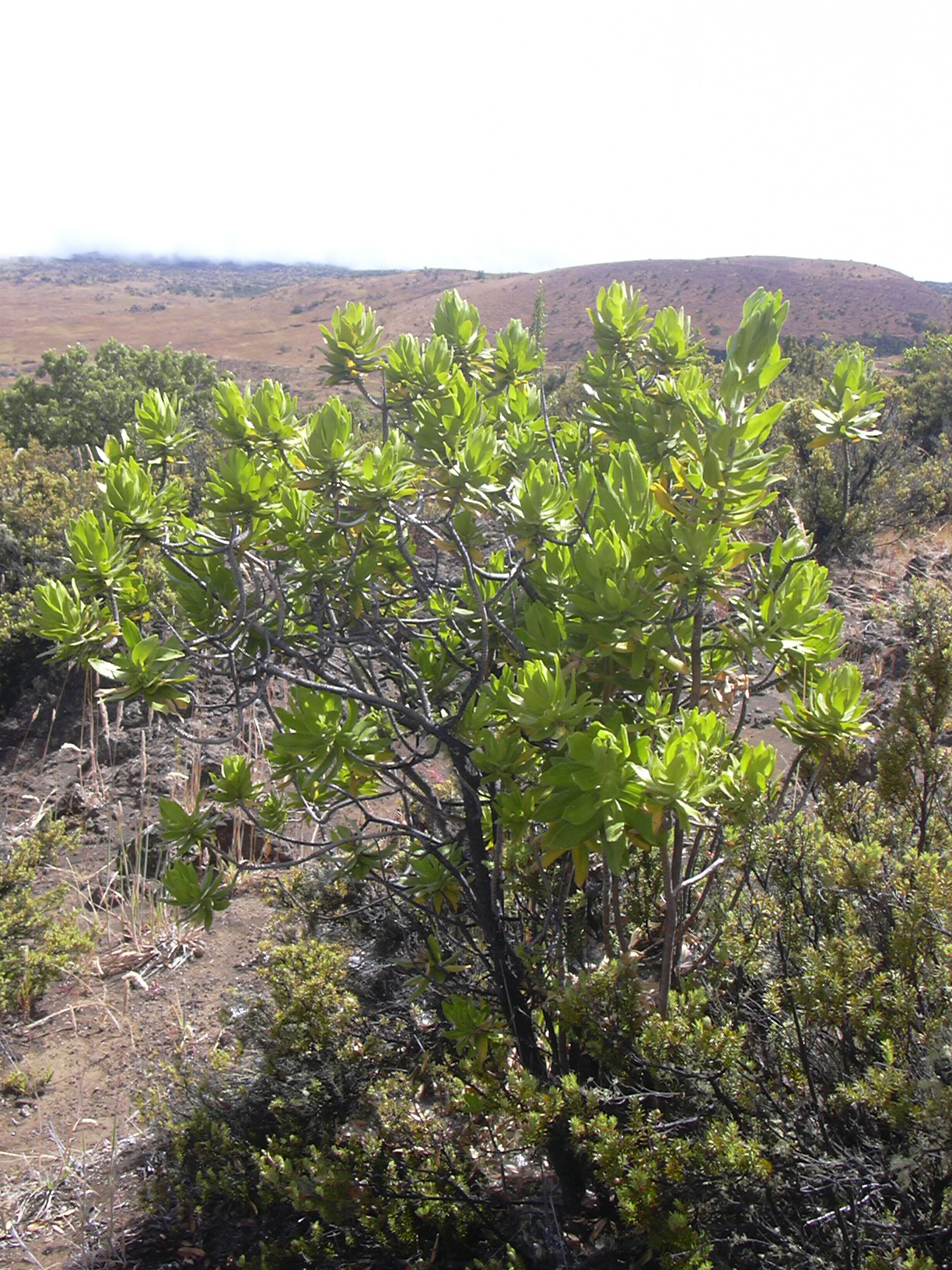

Conservation status
- Endangered (IUCN 2.3)

Scientific classification
- Kingdom: Plantae
- Clade: Tracheophytes
- Clade: Angiosperms
- Clade: Eudicots
- Clade: Asterids
- Order: Asterales
- Family: Asteraceae
- Genus: Dubautia
- Species: D. arborea

Binomial name
- Dubautia arborea (A.Gray) D.D.Keck

= Dubautia arborea =

Species of plant

Dubautia arborea, the tree dubautia or Mauna Kea dubautia, is a species of flowering plant that forms a shrub or small tree. The species is a member of the silversword alliance and the family Asteraceae. It is endemic to the island of Hawaiʻi and is endangered.

== Description ==
Dubautia arborea is one of the larger Dubautia, growing up to 6 metres (20 ft) tall and 4 m (13 ft) across. It most often resembles a large shrub. It produces yellow flowers, with flowering mostly occurring July–December.

== Taxonomy ==
The species is a member of the silversword alliance and the family Asteraceae.

== Distribution and habitat ==
Dubautia arborea grows at high elevations (2,125–3,100 m) on Mauna Kea and Hualalai, inhabiting subalpine dry forests dominated by māmane, high elevation shrublands, and the alpine stone desert above the tree line.

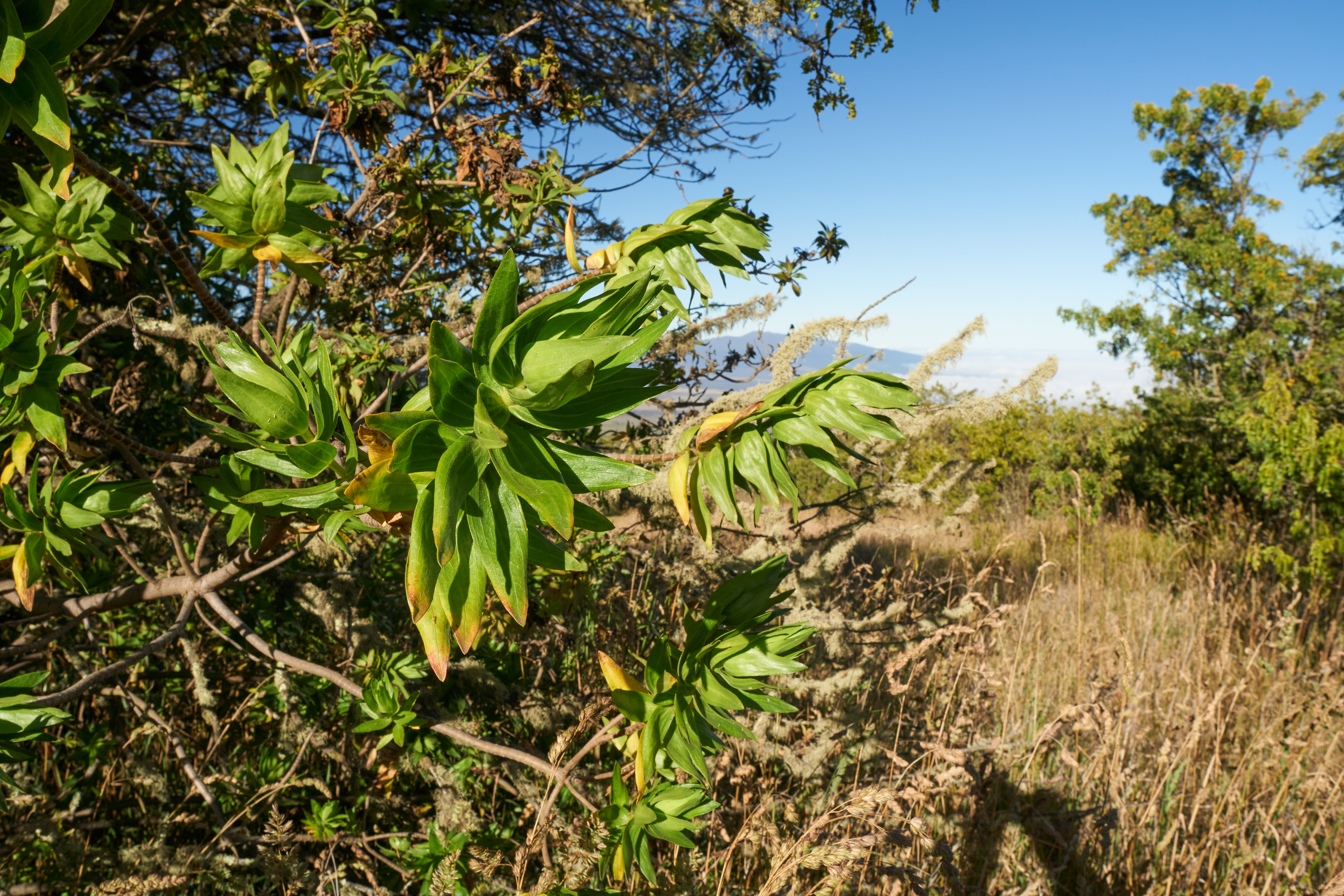
Growing on the leeward slopes of Mauna Kea

== Ecology ==
It is an endangered species that is threatened by feral grazing animals.
