= Dubautia kenwoodii =

Conservation status
- Critically endangered, possibly extinct (IUCN 3.1)

- Critically Imperiled (NatureServe)

Scientific classification
- Kingdom: Plantae
- Clade: Tracheophytes
- Clade: Angiosperms
- Clade: Eudicots
- Clade: Asterids
- Order: Asterales
- Family: Asteraceae
- Genus: Dubautia
- Species: D. kenwoodii

Binomial name
- Dubautia kenwoodii G.D.Carr

Species of plant

Dubautia kenwoodii, the Kalalau rim dubautia, is an "extremely rare" species of flowering plant in the family Asteraceae. It is endemic to Hawaii where it is known only from the island of Kauai. Only one plant has ever been seen: the type specimen. A part of this plant was collected in 1991 and the individual was described as a new species in 1998. It was federally listed as an endangered species of the United States in 2010. Like other Dubautia this plant is known as naʻenaʻe.

This member of the silversword alliance was discovered growing on a cliff along the Kalalau Rim adjacent to the Kalalau Valley on Kauai. The single plant was examined and collected by the biologist Ken Wood, who rappelled down the cliff to view it. It was later described to science and named for him. After Hurricane Iniki in 1992 this specimen was absent and feared extirpated. Biologists are hopeful that more individuals of this "exceedingly rare" and "critically endangered" plant will be located as more of Kauai is surveyed.

The only known specimen of the plant was described as a shrub half a meter tall with oppositely arranged leaves up to 12 centimeters long by 2 wide. The blades are shiny on top and more pale on the undersides. The flower heads contain several flowers which turn "rusty yellow in age".
