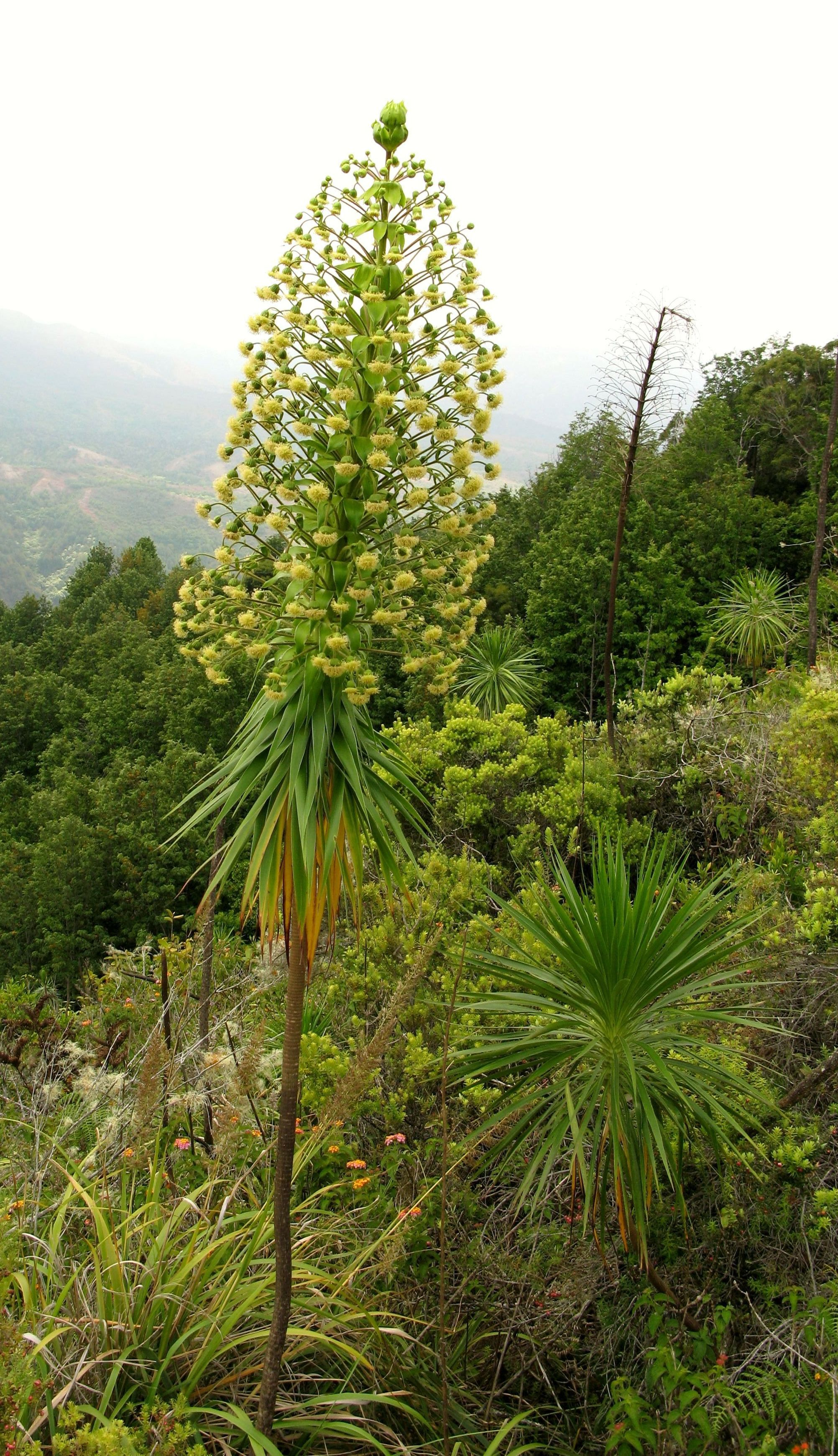
- Growing near Waimea Canyon

Conservation status
- Endangered (IUCN 3.1)

Scientific classification
- Kingdom: Plantae
- Clade: Tracheophytes
- Clade: Angiosperms
- Clade: Eudicots
- Clade: Asterids
- Order: Asterales
- Family: Asteraceae
- Genus: Wilkesia
- Species: W. gymnoxiphium

Binomial name
- Wilkesia gymnoxiphium A.Gray, 1852

= Wilkesia gymnoxiphium =

Species of plant

Wilkesia gymnoxiphium (Hawaiian iliau), is a species of flowering plant in the family Asteraceae that is endemic to the island of Kauaʻi in Hawaiʻi. It is classified as endangered on the IUCN Red List. Wilkesia is one of three genera, with Argyroxiphium (silverswords and greenswords) and Dubautia (a larger group with many varied species) that are believed to be descendant from a single species related to the North American tarweed. The members of these three genera constitute what is called the silversword alliance, a group whose exceedingly close genetic heritage is not reflected in their exceptionally diverse morphologies.

== Description ==
Wilkesia gymnoxiphium is a monocarpic rosette shrub, with rosettes elevated on woody stems as much as 5 m (16 ft) tall. Distinctive features include a usually unbranched, monocarpic axis, leaves in whorls of 9–20 that join to form a basal sheath around the stem, and peduncles that are commonly branched. Fountains of yellow, daisy-like flowers form mostly May to July. When unbranched the plant dies after flowering, but if it branches into multiple heads (as may happen if the top is broken off), each head will flower and die separately.

== Habitat ==
This species occurs only on Kauaʻi, on dry ridges or dry to mesic forests. The most common location is along the slopes of Waimea Canyon. It grows at elevations of 425–1,100 m (1,394–3,609 ft) in areas that receive 800–2,000 mm (31–79 in) of annual precipitation.

Heavily grazed by feral goats in the canyon, they are most often seen on inaccessible slopes. However, a dense population can be seen in a fenced enclosure just off the road heading to Kōkeʻe State Park.
