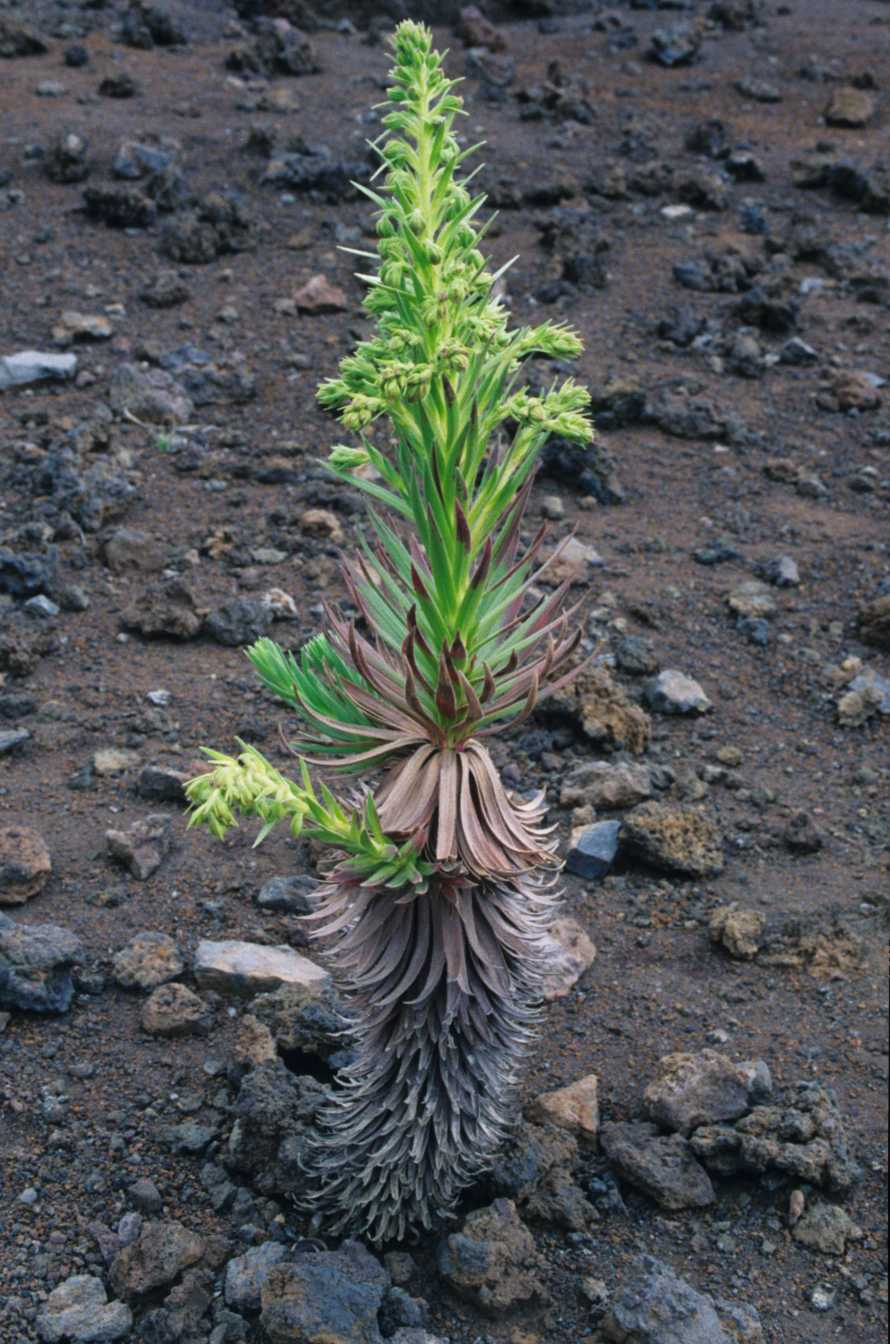

Scientific classification
- Kingdom: Plantae
- Clade: Tracheophytes
- Clade: Angiosperms
- Clade: Eudicots
- Clade: Asterids
- Order: Asterales
- Family: Asteraceae
- Tribe: Madieae
- Subtribe: Madiinae
- Genus: Argyroxiphium x Dubautia
- Species: A. sandwicense subsp. macrocephalum x D. menziesii

Binomial name
- Argyroxiphium sandwicense subsp. macrocephalum x Dubautia menziesii Carr.

= Argyroxiphium sandwicense subsp. macrocephalum x Dubautia menziesii =

Hybrid species of plant

Argyroxiphium sandwicense subsp. macrocephalum x Dubautia menziesii, commonly known as the Dubautia-silversword, is a hybrid species of silversword plant in the family Asteraceae, and is a part of the silversword alliance. The hybrid was formed between Argyroxiphium sandwicense subsp. macrocephalum and Dubautia menziesii, which are both species of plant native to the Haleakalā Shield Volcano, Maui, primarily in the Haleakalā Crater, that grow in alpine and subalpine zones.
