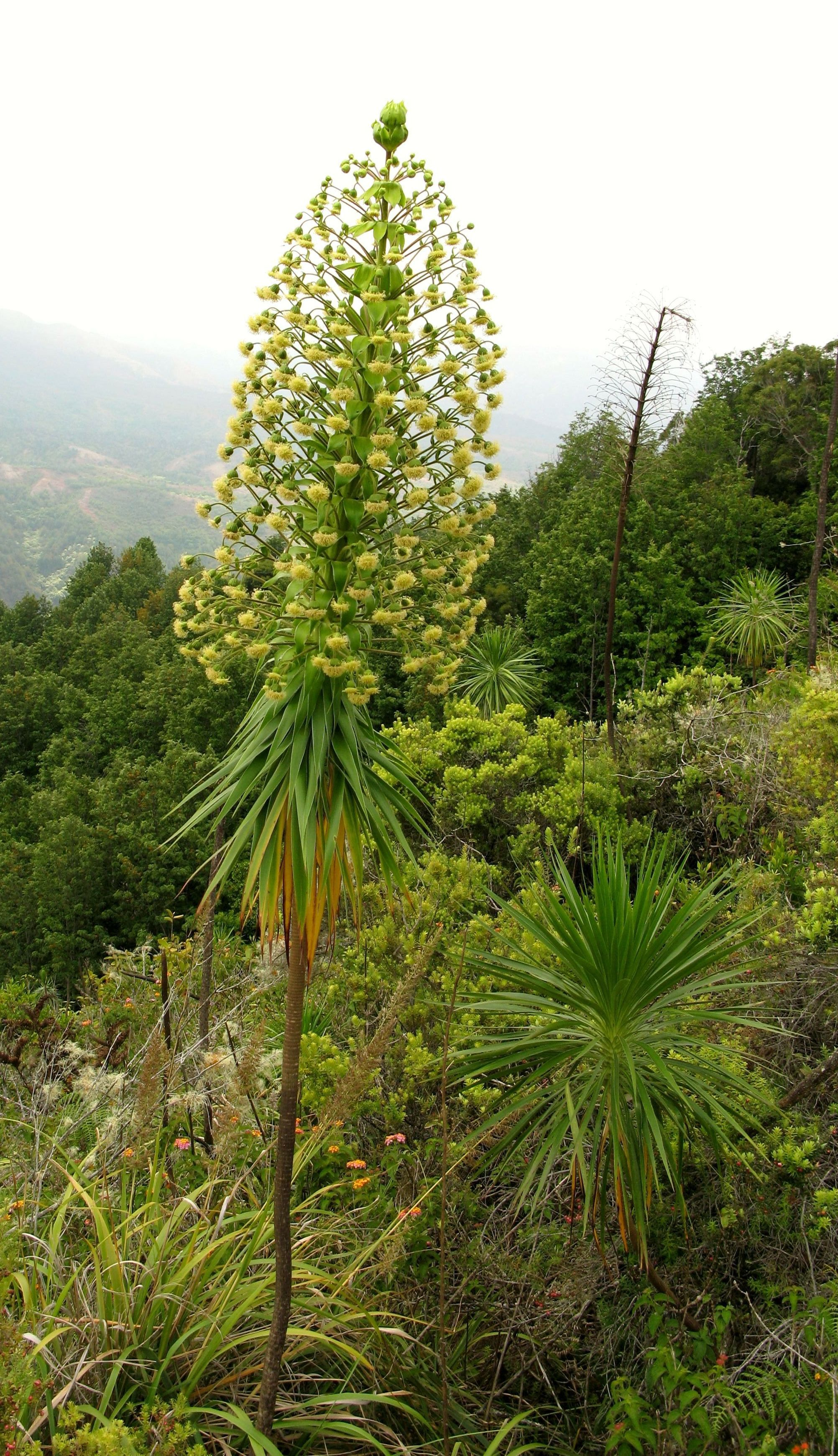
- Wilkesia gymnoxiphium

Scientific classification
- Kingdom: Plantae
- Clade: Tracheophytes
- Clade: Angiosperms
- Clade: Eudicots
- Clade: Asterids
- Order: Asterales
- Family: Asteraceae
- Subfamily: Asteroideae
- Tribe: Madieae
- Subtribe: Madiinae
- Genus: Wilkesia; A.Gray

Type species
- Wilkesia gymnoxiphium A.Gray, 1852

= Wilkesia =

Genus of flowering plants

Wilkesia is a genus of Hawaiian plants in the tribe Madieae within the family Asteraceae. It contains two perennials, both of which are endemic to the island of Kauaʻi in Hawaiʻi. Wilkesia is one of the three genera that make up the silversword alliance and is named after Captain Charles Wilkes.

Species

- Wilkesia gymnoxiphium A.Gray, 1852
- Wilkesia hobdyi H.St.John, 1971

formerly included

Wilkesia grayana - Argyroxiphium grayanum
