= Waltheria tomentosa =

Scientific classification
- Kingdom: Plantae
- Clade: Tracheophytes
- Clade: Angiosperms
- Clade: Eudicots
- Clade: Rosids
- Order: Malvales
- Family: Malvaceae
- Genus: Waltheria
- Species: W. tomentosa

Binomial name
- Waltheria tomentosa J.R.Forst., G.Forst.

Species of flowering plant

Waltheria tomentosa is a species of flowering plant in the family Malvaceae which is endemic to the Marquesas Islands. The species was described by Johann Reinhold Forster and Georg Forster.
