= Dubautia syndetica =

Conservation status
- Critically Imperiled (NatureServe)

Scientific classification
- Kingdom: Plantae
- Clade: Tracheophytes
- Clade: Angiosperms
- Clade: Eudicots
- Clade: Asterids
- Order: Asterales
- Family: Asteraceae
- Genus: Dubautia
- Species: D. syndetica

Binomial name
- Dubautia syndetica G.D.Carr & Lorence

Species of plant

Dubautia syndetica, the Wahiawa dubautia, is a plant species endemic to the island of Kauai in the state of Hawaii. It is found only in the upper portions of the Wahiawa drainage basin at elevations of 680–950 m.

Dubautia syndetica is a branching shrub up to 3 m tall. Leaves opposite, up to 16 cm long, elliptic to lanceolate, dark green above, lighter below, tapering to a point at the tip. Flowering heads number 10–90, with reddish-purple phyllaries. Each head has 8–17 pale yellow flowers.
