= Johann Gottfried Berger =

German physician (1659–1736)

Johann Gottfried von Berger
- Born: 11 November 1659; Halle an der Saale, Germany
- Died: 2 October 1736 (aged 76)
- Scientific career
- Fields: Physics
- Workplaces: Martin-Luther-University Halle-Wittenberg
- Doctoral advisor: Georg Wolfgang Wedel
- Notable students: Augustin Friedrich Walther

Johann Gottfried von Berger (November 11, 1659 – October 2, 1736) was a German physician and writer on physiology who was an early follower of the iatromechanical explanation of human organ functioning. Berger was born in Halle an der Saale and was educated at Jena (1682) and Leipzig. He became a professor of medicine at the University of Wittenberg and a court physician to King August of Poland. His brother Johann Wilhelm was also a physician.

Berger wrote a textbook Physiologia medica (1702) and his writings showed a leaning to iatromechanical theories and Cartesian ideas while opposing older ideas of Galenic humorism and the animism of theorists such as Georg Ernst Stahl.

Berger was said to have been influenced by the work of Gjuro Armen Baglivi and became party to a controversy over a manuscript of Baglivi's. Meeting in Rome in 1693, Berger suddenly left the city without notice, soon after Baglivi had lent him a number of manuscript pages from a planned work on reconstructive surgery. Although Baglivi feared that Berger would plagiarise it, historiographical investigations have never revealed any evidence of publication of the missing manuscript pages in any form. Why the pages were apparently removed from Rome, and how the dispute was settled is unknown, but by 1698 the two physicians were corresponding and on good terms.
