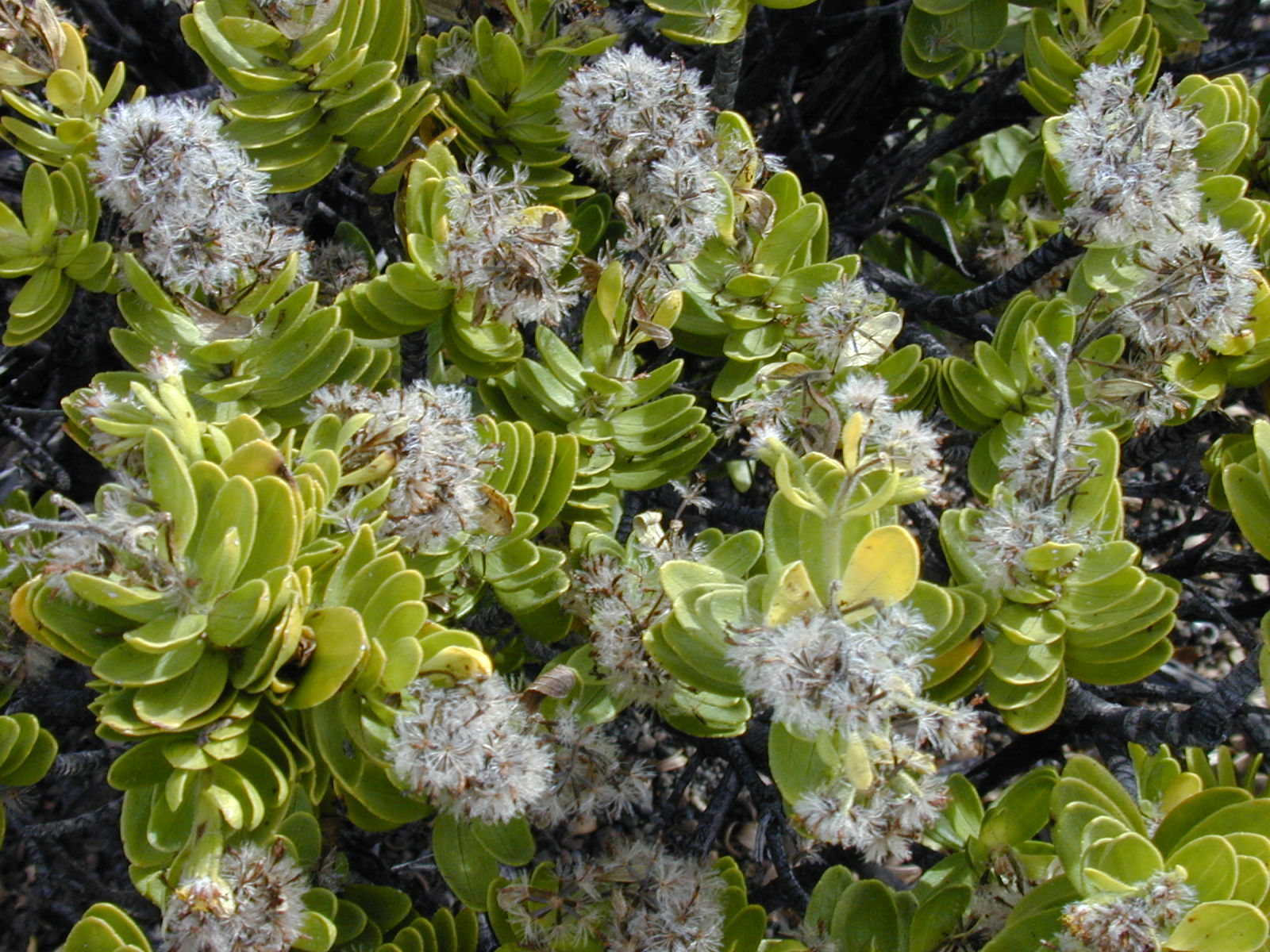
- Leaves and fruits of Dubautia menziesii

Scientific classification
- Kingdom: Plantae
- Clade: Embryophytes
- Clade: Tracheophytes
- Clade: Spermatophytes
- Clade: Angiosperms
- Clade: Eudicots
- Clade: Asterids
- Order: Asterales
- Family: Asteraceae
- Subfamily: Asteroideae
- Tribe: Madieae
- Subtribe: Madiinae
- Genus: Dubautia; Gaudich.

Synonyms
- Raillardia Gaudich.; × Railliautia Sherff

= Dubautia =

Genus of plants

Dubautia or na'ena'e is a genus of flowering plant in the family Asteraceae. The genus was named after Joseph Eugène DuBaut (1796–1832), an officer in the French Navy who participated in Freycinet's expedition.

The entire genus is endemic to Hawaii. It contains more species than the other two genera in the silversword alliance, including cushion plants, shrubs, trees, and lianas.

== Species ==
Accepted species and subspecies

- Dubautia arborea (A.Gray) D.D.Keck – tree dubautia
- Dubautia caliginis (C.N.Forbes) ined.
- Dubautia ciliolata (DC.) D.D.Keck
- Dubautia degeneri (Sherff) ined.
- Dubautia demissifolia (Sherff) D.D.Keck
- Dubautia grayana (Hillebr.) ined.
- Dubautia gymnoxiphium (A.Gray) ined.
- Dubautia herbstobatae G.D.Carr
- Dubautia hobdyi (H.St.John) ined.
- Dubautia imbricata H.St.John & G.D.Carr
  - Dubautia imbricata subsp. acronaea G.D.Carr
  - Dubautia imbricata subsp. imbricata
- Dubautia kai (C.N.Forbes) ined.
- Dubautia kalalauensis B.G.Baldwin & G.D.Carr
- Dubautia kauensis (Rock & M.Neal) ined.
- Dubautia kenwoodii G.D.Carr
- Dubautia knudsenii Hillebr.
- Dubautia laevigata A.Gray
- Dubautia latifolia (A.Gray) D.D.Keck
- Dubautia laxa Hook. & Arn.
- Dubautia linearis (Gaudich.) D.D.Keck
  - Dubautia linearis subsp. hillebrandii (H.Mann) G.D.Carr
  - Dubautia linearis subsp. linearis
- Dubautia menziesii (A.Gray) D.D.Keck
- Dubautia microcephala Skottsberg – small-head dubautia
- Dubautia montana (H.Mann) D.D.Keck
- Dubautia paleata A.Gray
- Dubautia paludosa (H.St.John) ined.
- Dubautia pauciflorula H.St. John & G.D.Carr
- Dubautia plantaginea Gaudich.
  - Dubautia plantaginea subsp. humilis G.D.Carr
  - Dubautia plantaginea subsp. magnifolia (Sherff) G.D.Carr
  - Dubautia plantaginea subsp. plantaginea
- Dubautia platyphylla (A.Gray) D.D.Keck
- Dubautia raillardioides Hillebr.
- Dubautia reticulata (Sherff) D.D.Keck – net-veined dubautia
- Dubautia sandwicensis (DC.) ined.
- Dubautia scabra (DC.) D.D.Keck
- Dubautia sherffiana Fosberg
- Dubautia syndetica G.D.Carr & D.H.Lorence
- Dubautia thyrsiflora (Sherff) D.D.Keck
- Dubautia virescens (Hillebr.) ined.
- Dubautia waialealae Rock
- Dubautia waianapanapaensis G.D.Carr
