= Johannes Berger =

Catholic bishop

Most Reverend Johannes Berger
- Auxiliary Bishop of Freising; Titular Bishop of Belline
- Church: Catholic Church
- Diocese: Diocese of Freising
- In office: 1475–1481

Orders
- Ordination: 1454
- Consecration: 1478 by Sixtus von Tannberg

Personal details
- Died: 26 May 1481 Freising, Germany

Johannes Berger OSA (died 1481) was a Roman Catholic prelate who served as Auxiliary Bishop of Freising (1475–1481).

== Biography ==
Johannes Berger was ordained a priest in the Order of Hermits of Saint Augustine in 1454. In 1475, he was appointed during the papacy of Pope Sixtus IV as Auxiliary Bishop of Freising and Titular Bishop of Belline. In 1478, he was consecrated bishop by Sixtus von Tannberg, Bishop of Freising. He served as Auxiliary Bishop of Freising until his death on 26 May 1481.

== See also ==
- Catholic Church in Germany
