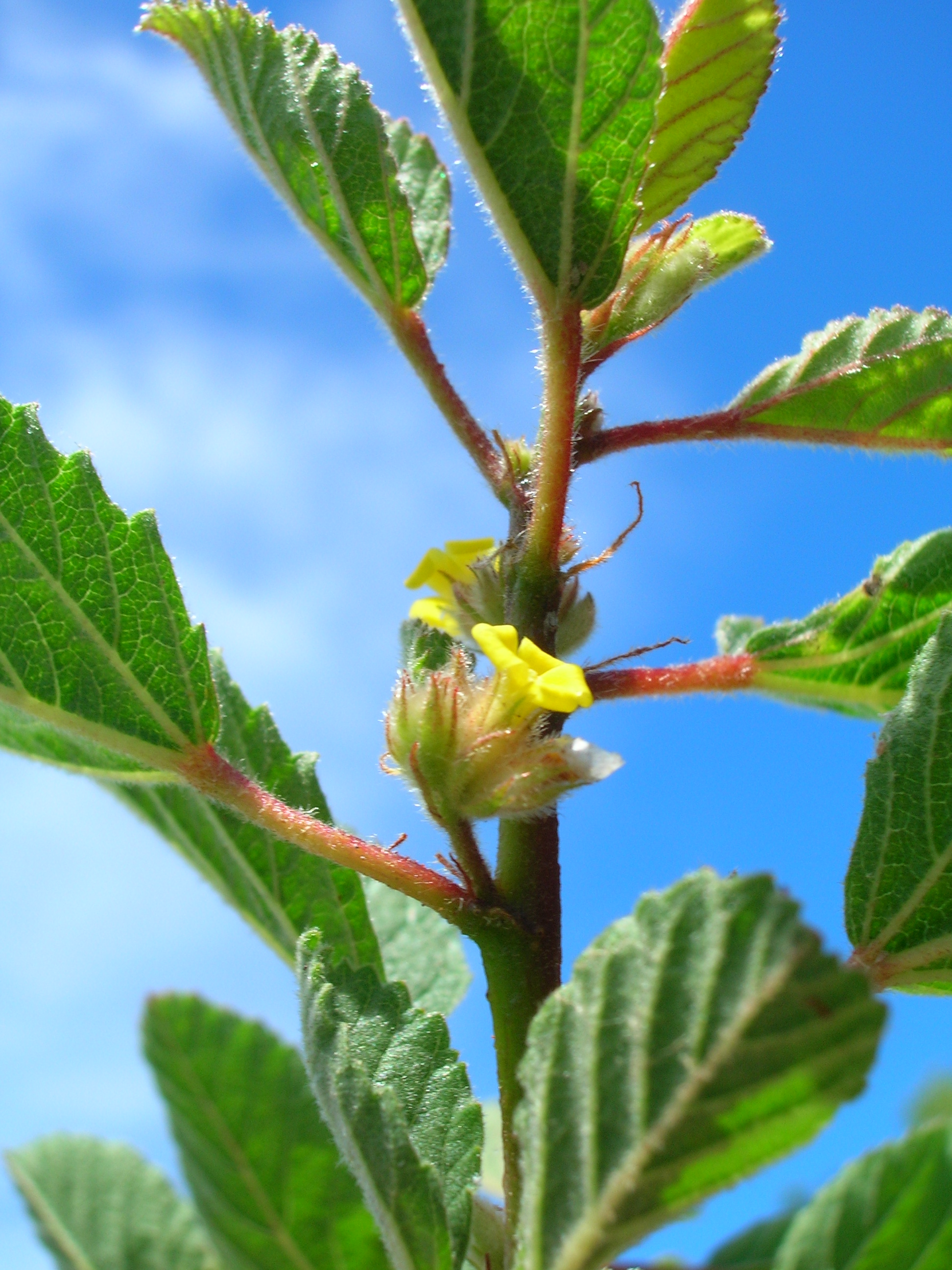

Conservation status
- Least Concern (IUCN 3.1)

Scientific classification
- Kingdom: Plantae
- Clade: Embryophytes
- Clade: Tracheophytes
- Clade: Angiosperms
- Clade: Eudicots
- Clade: Rosids
- Order: Malvales
- Family: Malvaceae
- Genus: Waltheria
- Species: W. indica

Binomial name
- Waltheria indica L.

Synonyms
- Waltheria americana L.

= Waltheria indica =

Sleepy morning

Species of flowering plant

Waltheria indica is a species of flowering plant in the mallow family, Malvaceae, that has a pantropical distribution. It is believed to have originated in the Neotropics. Common names include sleepy morning, basora prieta, hierba de soldado, guimauve, mauve-gris, moto-branco, fulutafu, kafaki, and ʻuhaloa (Hawaii)(and in South Africa - "meidebossie"). W. indica is a short-lived subshrub or shrub, reaching a height of 2 m (6.6 ft) and a stem diameter of 2 cm (0.79 in). It is most common in dry, disturbed or well-drained, moist habitats. In Puerto Rico, it grows in areas that receive 750–1,800 mm (30–71 in) of annual rainfall and at elevations from sea level to more 400 m (1,300 ft).

== Medicinal uses ==
The roots, leaves and flowers of W. indica are all used medicinally in some cultures.
