= Dry–mesic prairie =

Grassland biome

Dry–mesic prairie is a native grassland community made up mid-to-tall grasses (1–2 m tall) and a diverse mixture of forbs. The sandy loam or loamy sand soils of Dry-mesic Prairie support grasses that are shorter and grow less densely than Wet-mesic and Wet Prairies. Big bluestem (Andropogon gerardi), little bluestem (Andropogon scoparius), Indian grass (Sorghastrum nutans), and porcupine grass (Hesperostipa spartea) are the most abundant grasses in dry-mesic prairie.
