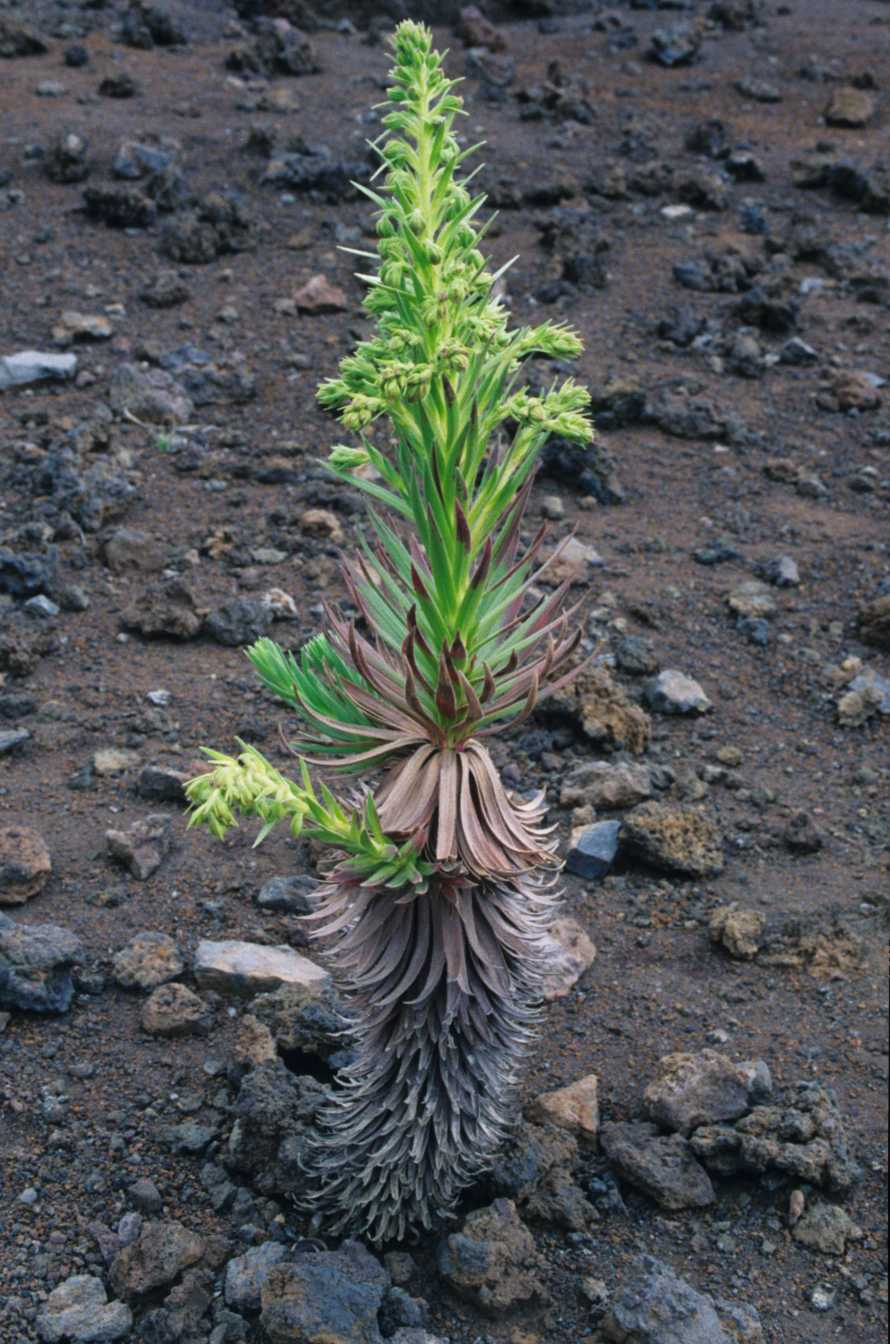
- Dubautia-silversword hybrid in Haleakalā crater

Scientific classification
- Kingdom: Plantae
- Clade: Tracheophytes
- Clade: Angiosperms
- Clade: Eudicots
- Clade: Asterids
- Order: Asterales
- Family: Asteraceae
- Subtribe: Madiinae
- Alliance: Silversword alliance

Genera
- Argyroxiphium; Dubautia; Wilkesia

= Silversword alliance =

Group of Hawaiian plants that show remarkable diversity

The silversword alliance refers to an adaptive radiation of around 34 species in the tarweed subtribe, Madiinae, of the sunflower family, Asteraceae. The group is endemic to Hawaii, and is derived from a single immigrant to the islands. The ancestor of the silversword alliance was a species of Pacific Coast tarweed, which differ significantly in appearance from members of the alliance. For radiating from a common ancestor at an estimated 3.5±1.5 Ma, the clade is extremely diverse, composed of trees, shrubs, subshrubs, mat-plants, cushion plants, rosette plants, and lianas. Consequently, the silversword alliance has been described as a model system for the study of plant evolution and adaptive radiations.

The silversword alliance is named for its most famous and visually striking members, the silverswords. The species of the clade belong to three genera: Wilkesia, Argyroxiphium, and Dubautia. There are five species, including two species known as greenswords, in the genus Argyroxiphium, confined to the islands of Maui and Hawaiʻi, and two species of Wilkesia (iliau) on Kauaʻi. The bulk of the species are placed in the genus Dubautia, which is widespread on all the main islands. Similar species frequently occur in the same habitat and are often difficult to tell apart. Hybrids frequently occur between Dubautia species, and between Dubautia and Argyroxiphium.

Many members of the silversword alliance are threatened or endangered, and are highly vulnerable to browsing by introduced feral animals.

== Characteristics ==
All members of the silversword alliance are perennials, but otherwise occupy a wide range of ecological niches. The genus Dubautia is the most morphologically diverse of the three genera, containing cushion plants, shrubs, trees, and lianas; all Argyroxiphium and Wilkesia species are shrubby and form rosettes. Plants take several years to flower, and can be monocarpic, only flowering once before dying, or polycarpic, flowering several times. Woody species, such as D. arborea, can live longer than 50 years. Some species also can reproduce vegetatively, meaning a single genotype can exist for many years.

Almost all of the members of the clade have longitudinal leaf venation. Meanwhile, leaf shapes are highly diverse. Argyroxiphium and Wilkesia species have leaves that are long and strap-shaped to linear. Dubautia species show a wider range of leaf morphologies, but Dubautia species with 2n = 14 chromosomes tend to have longer leaves than 2n = 13 members of the genus. In almost all members of the alliance, the juvenile leaves of the plant are larger and less firm than mature leaves.

Like other members of the Asteraceae, silverswords have composite inflorescences known as capitula, made up of numerous smaller flowers ("florets"). Dubautia and Wilkesia species lack ray florets, the outer flowers resembling petals present in many other Asteraceae species. Capitula can vary widely in size between silversword species, and can be made up of anywhere from two to 650 individual florets. In Argyroxiphium and Wilkesia, these capitula tend to be very large. Almost all silversword species have sticky, glandular trichome-covered bracts surrounding the capitula, a trait shared with their Californian tarweed relatives.

== Evolution ==
Due to their isolated location and recent geologic origin, the Hawaiian Islands have high numbers of endemic plant and animal species, often originating through adaptive radiations.

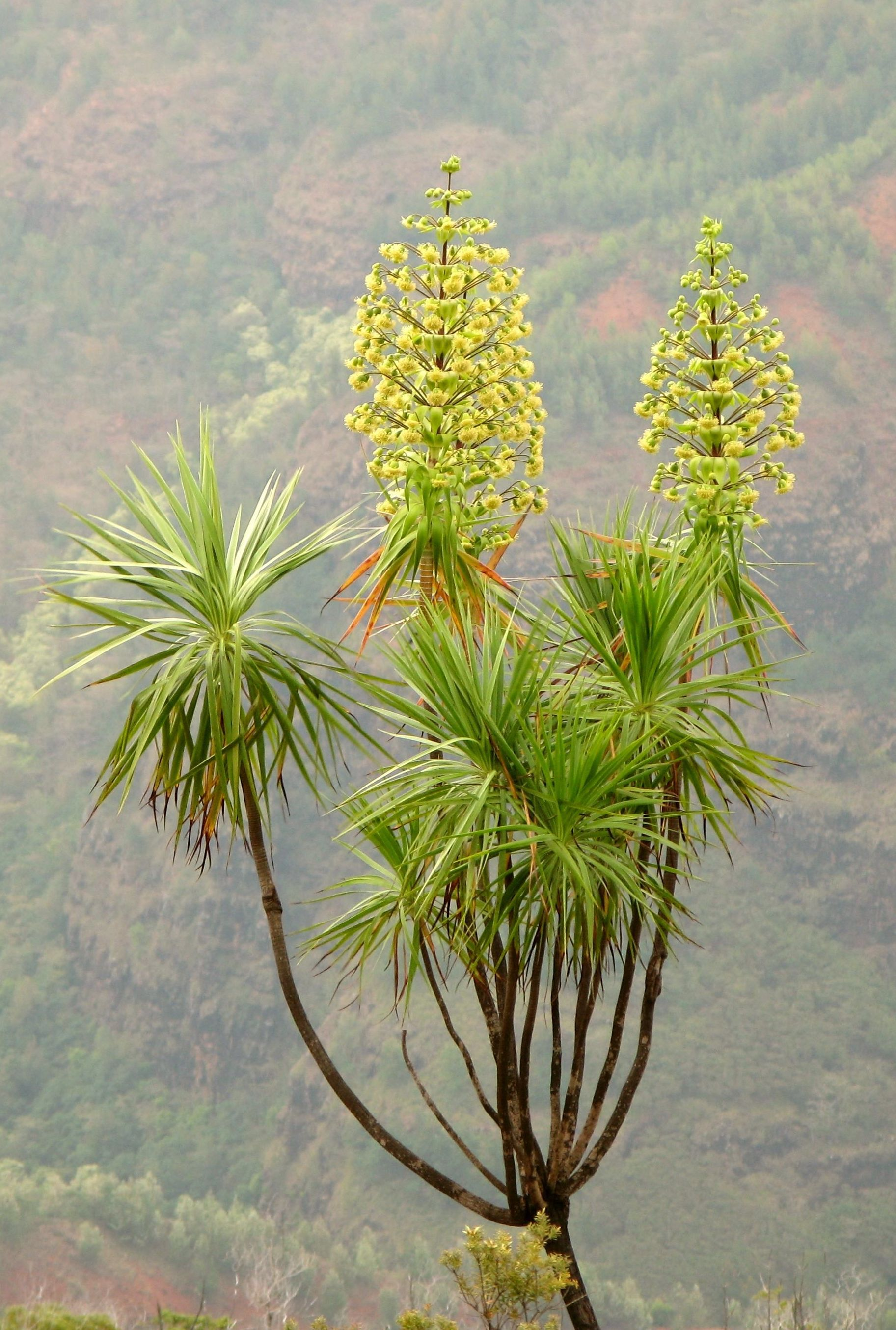
Wilkesia gymnoxiphium near the rim of Waimea Canyon, Kauaʻi.

All members of the silversword alliance trace their lineage back to a species of Pacific coast tarweed, very similar to extant species like Carlquistia muirii, which likely arrived on Kauaʻi around 5.1 Ma. The last common ancestor of all extant members of the silversword alliance lived approximately 3.5±1.5 Ma. Silverswords demonstrate significantly higher rates of diversification than many other plant groups, having evolved a wide diversity of forms in a comparatively short time period. Unlike their closest relatives, many silversword species readily hybridize and produce fertile offspring, which likely played a significant role in their diversification and ability to colonize new habitats.

Species of Argyroxiphium and Wilkesia, and most species of Dubautia, have 2n = 14 chromosomes; several species of Dubautia are instead 2n = 13. All of the silverswords are tetraploid, differing from the diploidy of their closest North American relatives. How the silverswords' chromosome number arose is a matter of some uncertainty, but two major scientific theories have been proposed. One is that two ancestor species, one with n = 6 and one with n = 8 chromosomes hybridized, resulting in a n = 7 hybrid. The hybrid then, by allopolyploidy, doubled its chromosome number spontaneously, leading to the resultant and extant 2n = 14 species. Alternatively, the modern chromosome number could have arisen from an ancestor like Anisocarpus scabridus, with a chromosome complement of n = 7, and then arisen by autopolyploidy, instead of needing to first hybridize.

== Ecology ==
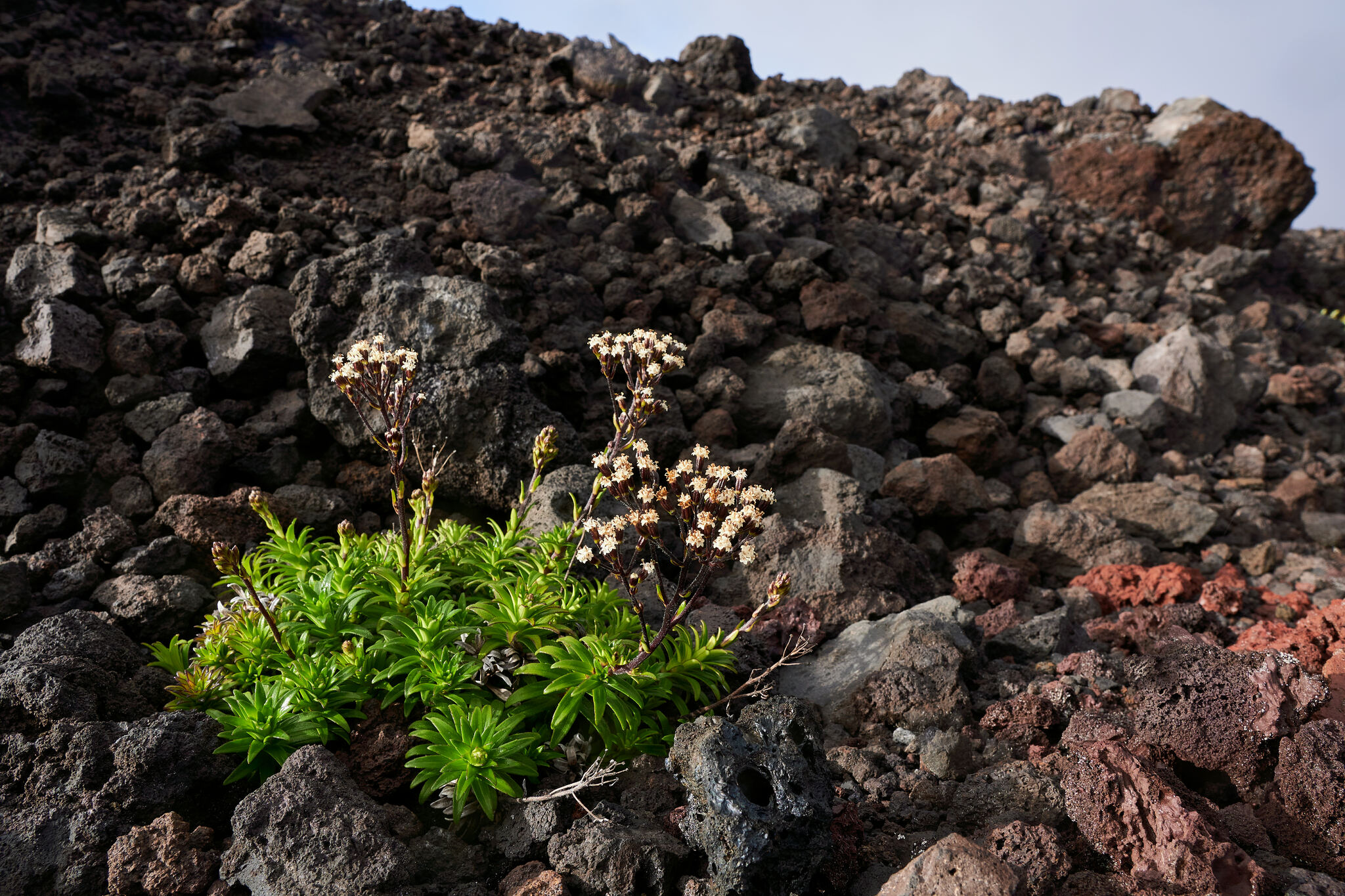
Dubautia scabra on a 1935 Mauna Loa lava flow.

Silverswords occur in diverse habitats across the Hawaiian islands, though most species are single-island endemics. Both Wilkesia species, and several Dubautia species, occur in dry scrub and woodland habitats with relatively low annual rainfall. Most Argyroxiphium species, and many Dubautia species, grow in either wet scrub and forest habitats or bog habitats, or both. Several Dubautia species and one Argyroxiphium occur on recent lava flows and cinder landscapes, exposed volcanic substrate with very little soil where few other plant species can grow. Many species grow sympatrically, leading to frequent hybridization, especially between Dubautia species and between Dubautia and Argyroxiphium. Hybridization can occur between even very morphologically distinct species, such as between A. sandwicense and D. menziesii.

== Conservation ==
Two species of Argyroxiphium, 15 species of Dubautia, and both species of Wilkesia are listed as endangered or critically endangered according to the IUCN Red List, and one species of Argyroxiphium and two species of Dubautia are additionally considered threatened. Two species, Argyroxiphium virescens and Dubautia kenwoodii, have likely gone extinct. Introduced species, including both browsing ungulate species and invasive plant species, pose a significant threat to many silversword species. Pollinator loss is also a major factor in the decline of several species.
